= Algarve =

- Region
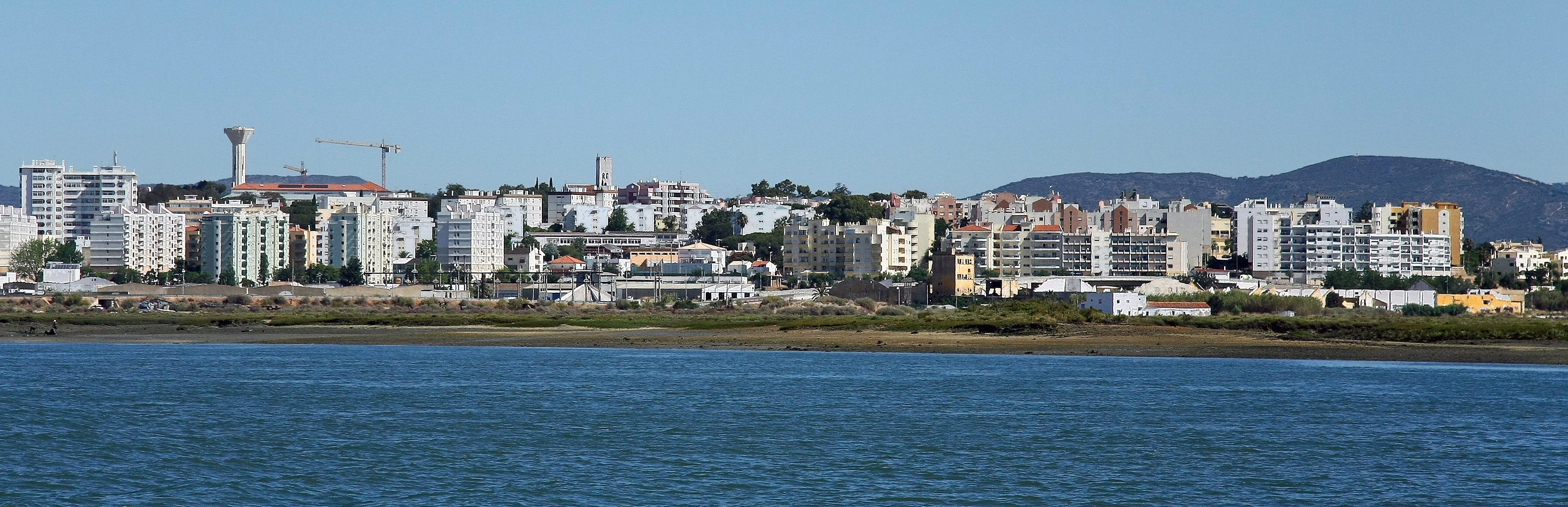
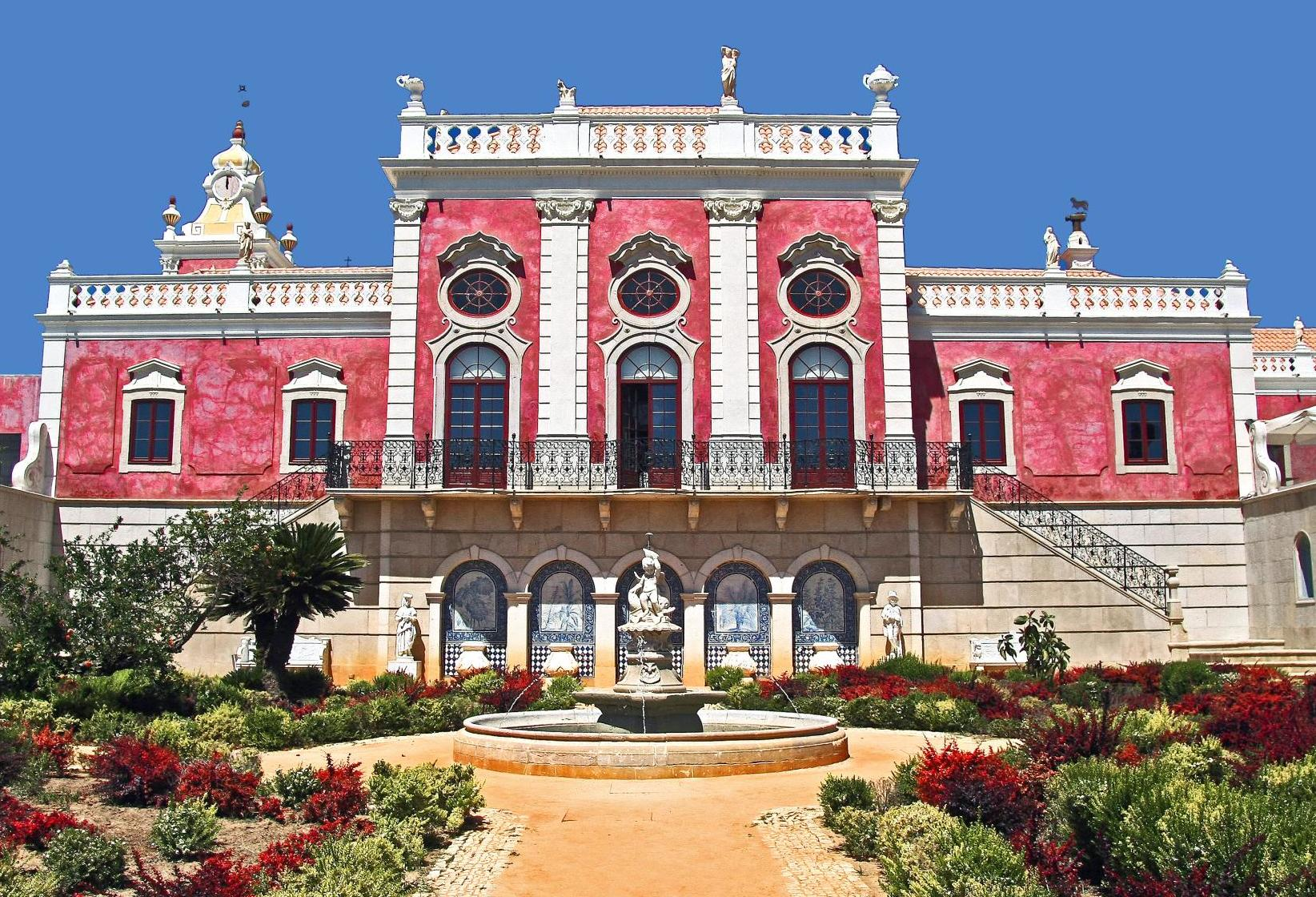
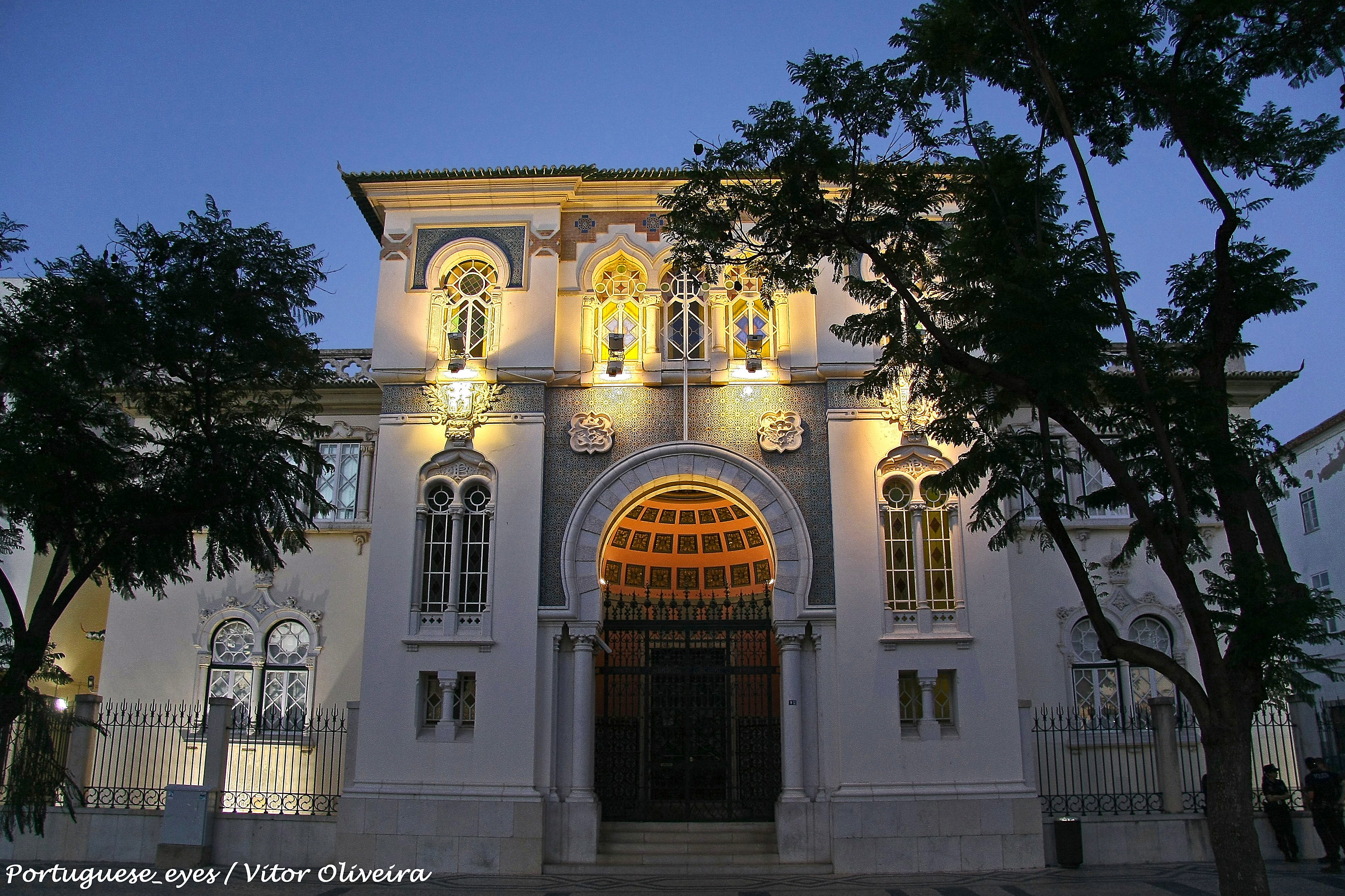
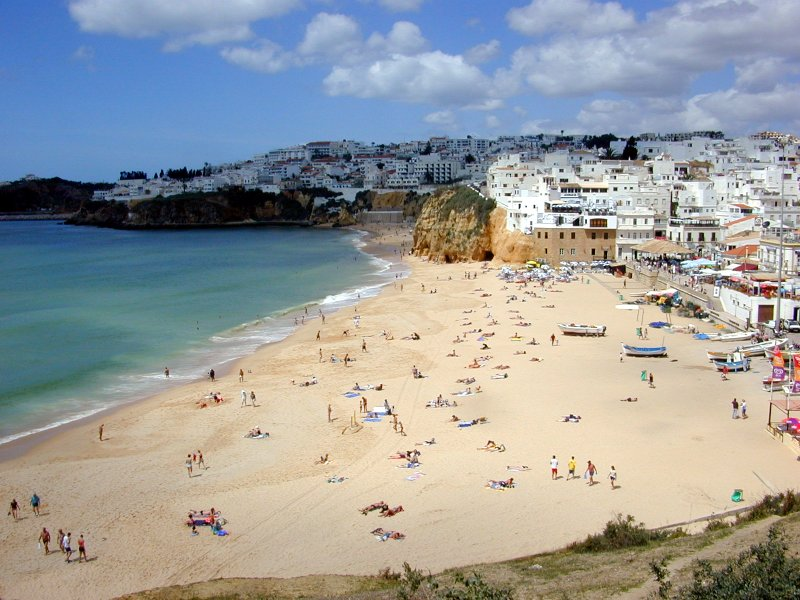
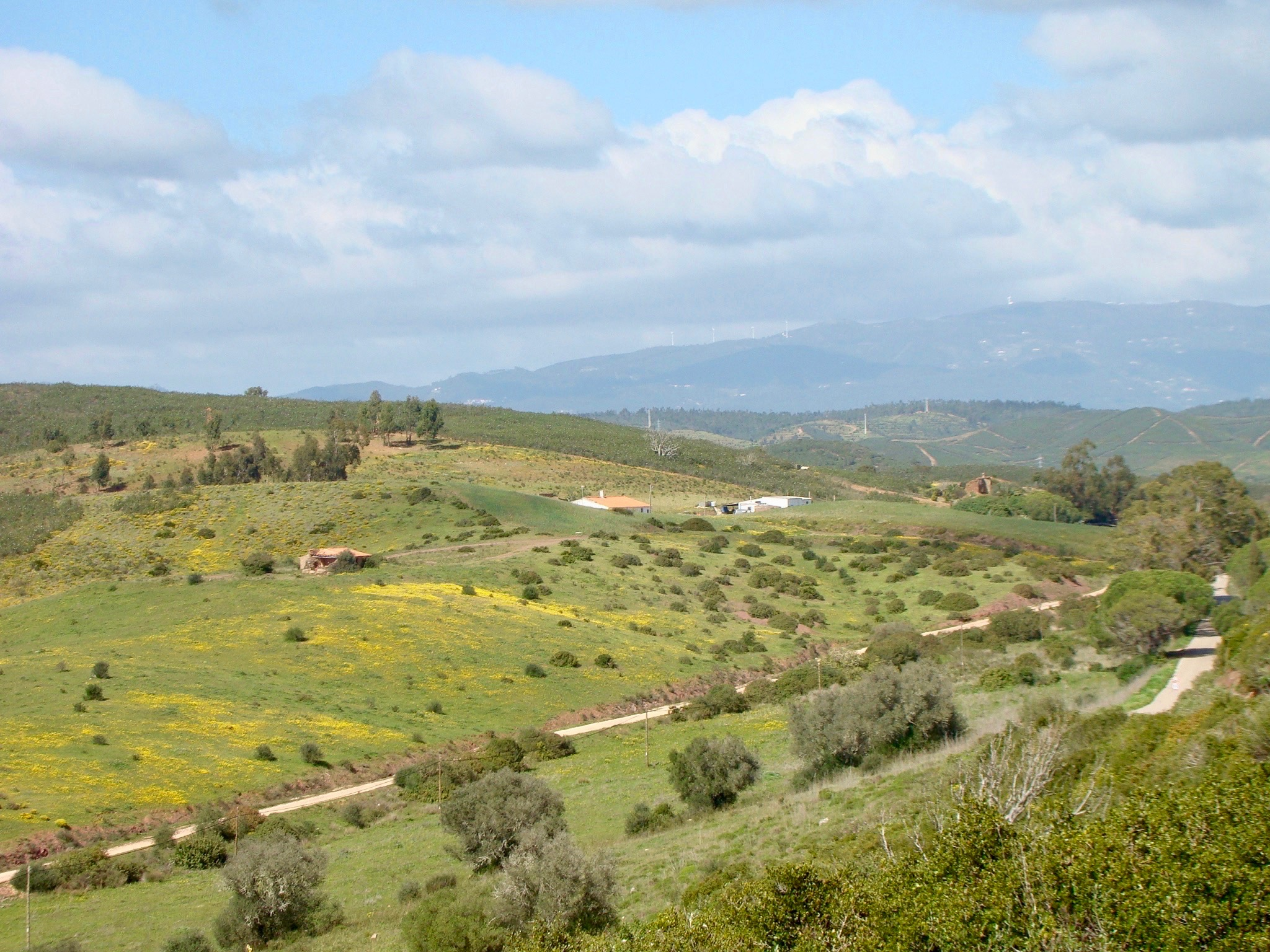
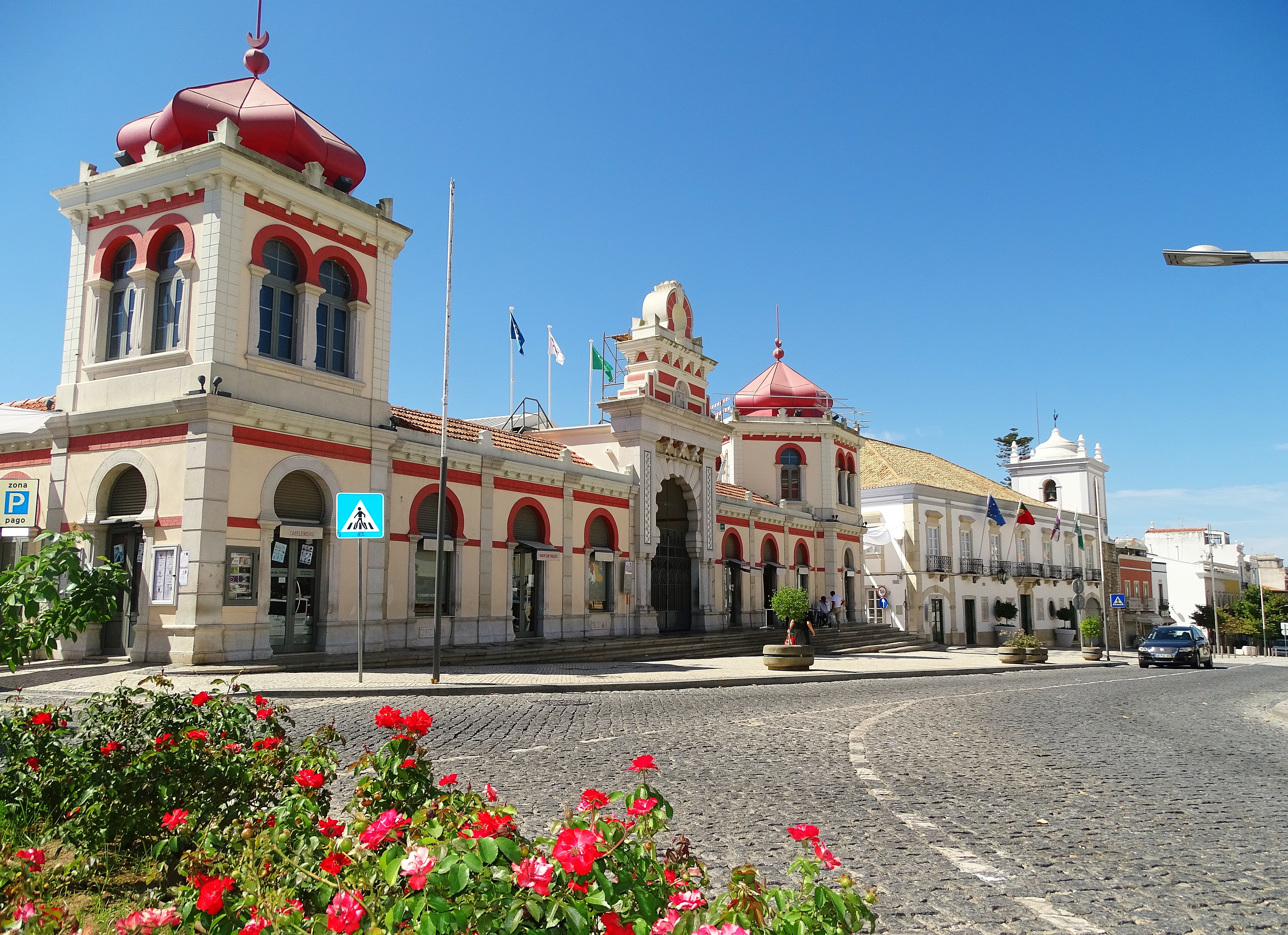
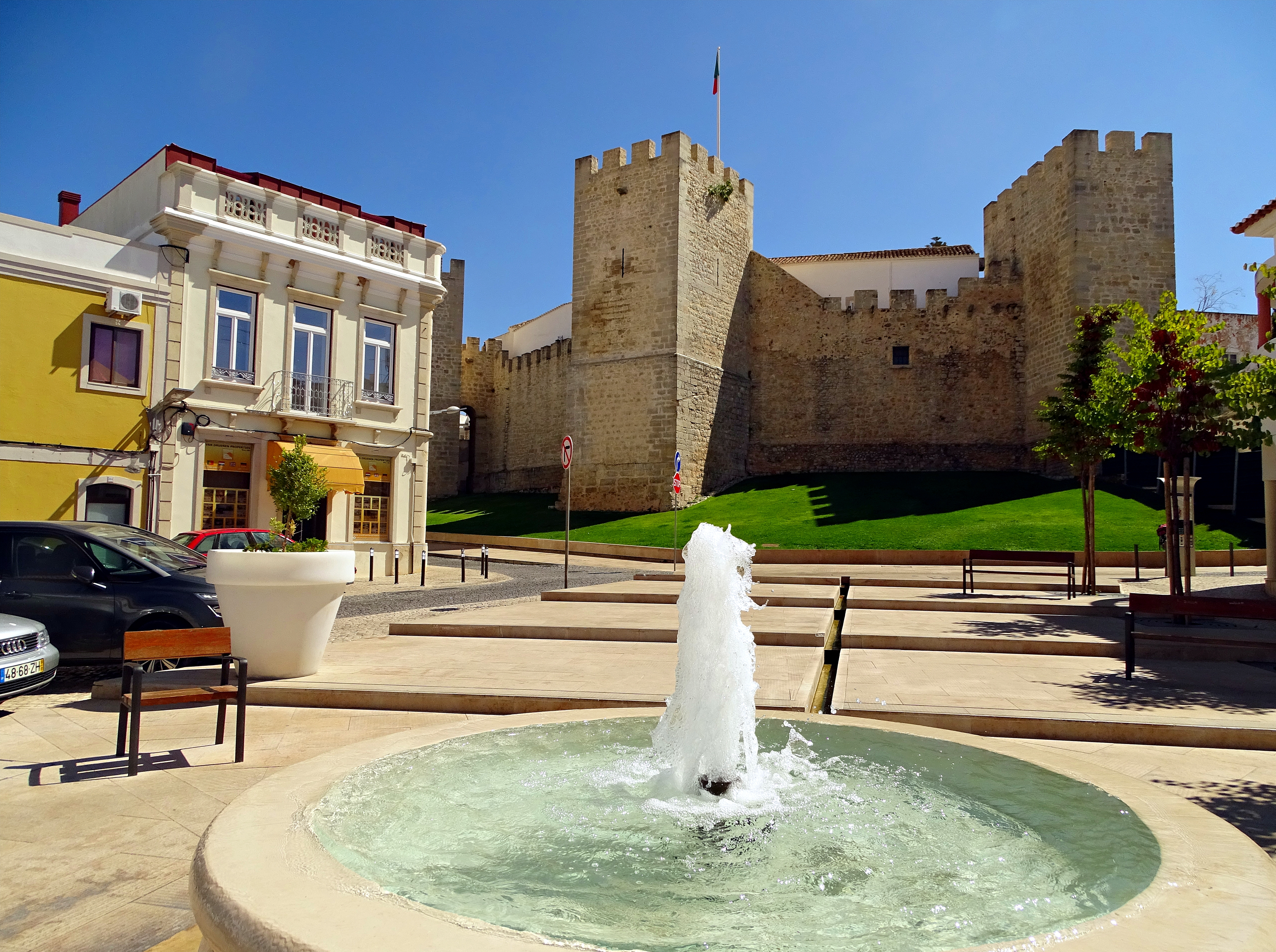
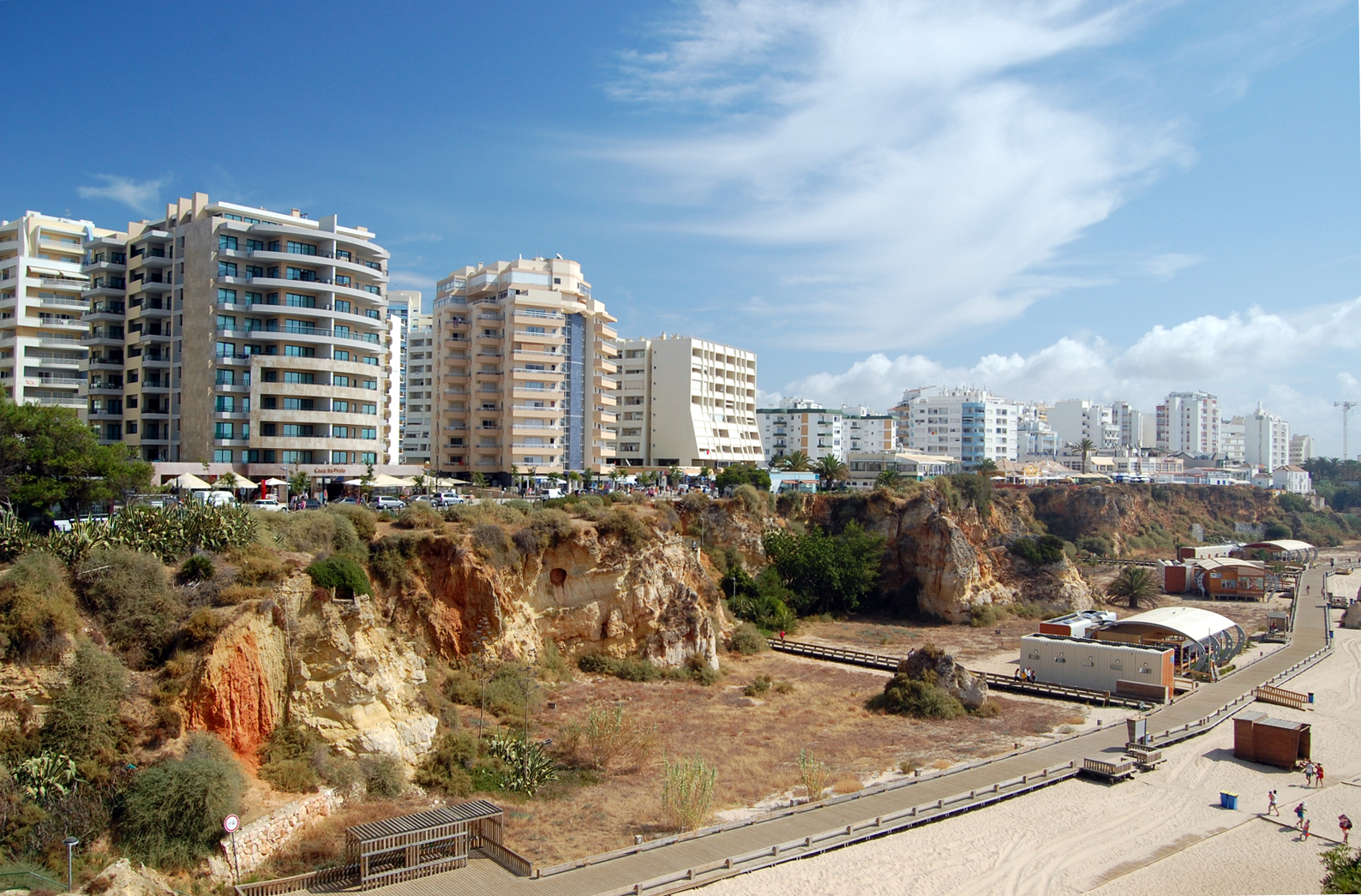
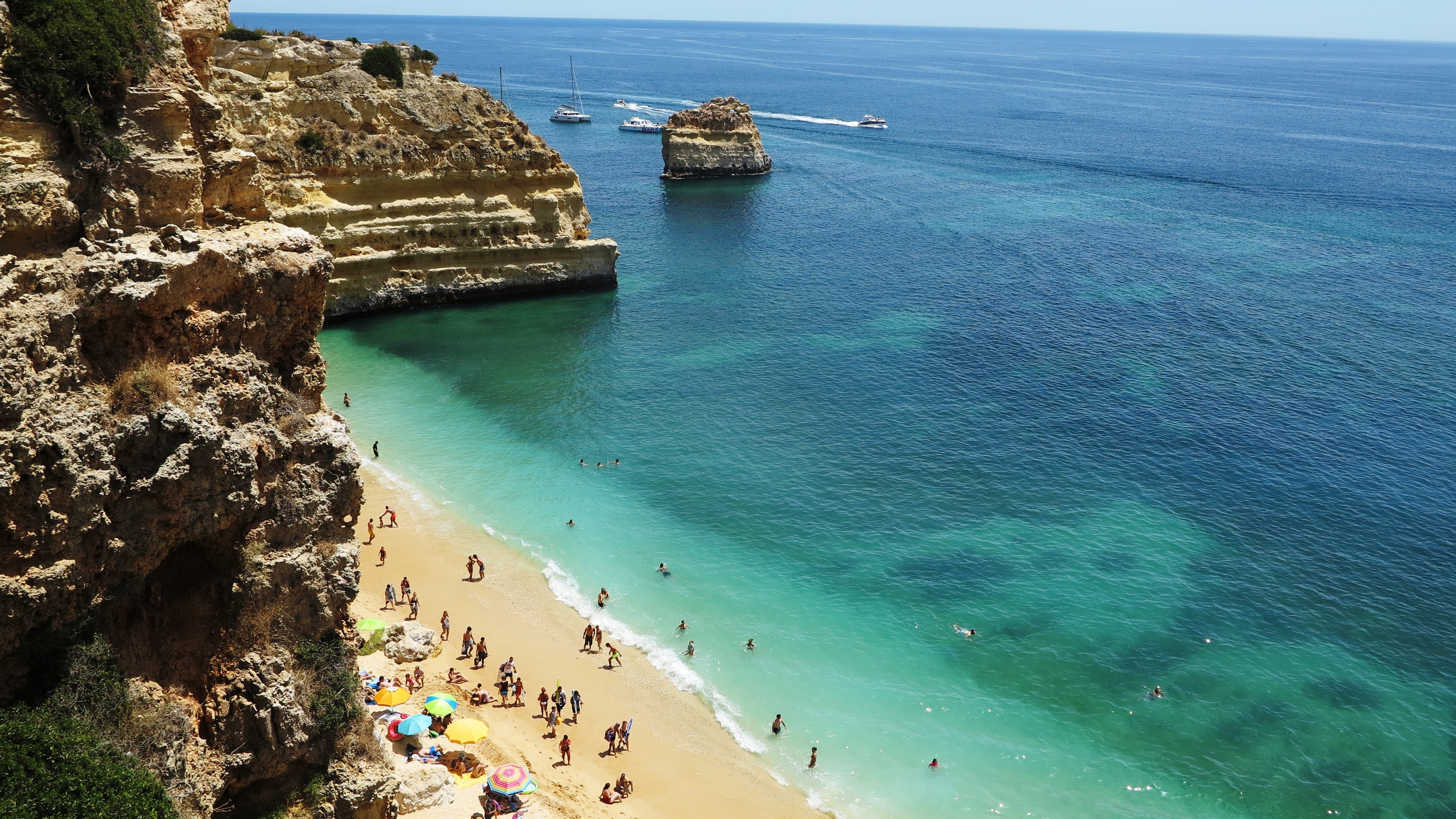
- Top left to bottom right: aerial view of the capital of Algarve Faro; Estói Palace; City gates in Faro; A beach in Albufeira; The open fields of the Algarve in spring; Mourish style market of Loulé; Castle of Loule; The city of Portimão; Algarve's typical coast (Marinha Beach, near Lagoa)
- Interactive map of Algarve
- Location within Europe Location within Portugal
- Coordinates: 37.242°N 8.170°W
- Country: Portugal
- Kingdom of Algarve within the Kingdom of Portugal: 1249–1815
- Constituent kingdom of the United Kingdom of Portugal, Brazil and the Algarves: 1815–1825
- 1825–1910
- Region of the Portuguese Republic: since 1910
- Capital: Faro

Area
  - Total: 4,996.80 km^{2} (1,929.28 sq mi)

Population (2021)
  - Total: 467,495 ▲
  - Rank: 5th
  - Density: 93.5589/km^{2} (242.316/sq mi)
- Demonym(s): Algarvio algarvio (m.), algarvia (f.)

GDP (nominal)
  - Rank total: 6th (2024)
  - Rank per capita: ▲2nd (2024)
  - Total: ▲€14.312 billion (2024)
  - Per capita: ▲€29,302 (2024)
- Time zone: UTC+0 (WET)
  - Summer (DST): UTC+1 (WEST)
- ISO 3166 code: PT-08
- HDI (2021): ▲0.849 very high · 4th
- Website: www.ccdr-alg.pt
- Statistics from INE (2005); geographic detail from Instituto Geográfico Português (2010)

The Algarve (UK: /ælˈɡɑːrv, ˈælɡ-/, US: /ɑːlˈɡɑːrvə, ælˈ-/, European Portuguese: [alˈɣaɾvɨ]) is the southernmost NUTS II region of continental Portugal. It has an area of 4,997 km^{2} (1,929 sq mi) with 467,495 permanent inhabitants and incorporates 16 municipalities (concelhos or municípios in Portuguese).

The region has its administrative centre in the city of Faro, where both the region's international airport and public university, the University of Algarve, are located. The region is the same as the area included in the Faro District and is subdivided into two zones, one to the West (Barlavento) and another to the East (Sotavento). Tourism and related activities are extensive and make up the bulk of the Algarve's summer economy. Production of food which includes fish and other seafood, as well as different types of fruit and vegetables such as oranges, figs, plums, carob pods, almonds, avocados, tomatoes, cauliflowers, strawberries, and raspberries, are also economically important in the region.

Although Lisbon surpasses the Algarve in terms of tourism revenue, the Algarve is still, overall, considered to be the biggest and most important Portuguese tourist region, having received an estimated total of 4.2 million tourists in 2017. Its population triples in the peak holiday season due to seasonal residents. Due to the high standards of quality of life, mainly regarding safety and access to public health services, as well as due to cultural factors and considerably good weather conditions, the Algarve is becoming increasingly sought after, mostly by central and northern Europeans, as a permanent place to settle. Several studies and reports have concluded that the Algarve is among the world's best places to retire.

The Algarve is the fourth most developed Portuguese region – in 2019, it was placed fourth out of seven regions with a human development index (HDI) of 0.847 (Portugal's HDI average was 0.864 in 2019). With a GDP per capita at 85.2% of the European Union average, it has the second highest purchasing power in the country, behind only the Lisbon Metropolitan Area.

== Etymology ==
The term "Algarve" comes from the Arabic الغرب (al-ġarb), meaning "the west", that is, Western Al-Andalus. This term was used by the Portuguese to refer to the areas of Iberia directly to their south, which were under Muslim control, with the term eventually narrowing down to only the southwesternmost region.

After a streak of military victories against the Wattasids in 1471 that resulted in the conquest of the cities of Asilah and Tangier, the Portuguese, who saw their overseas conquests as an extension of the Reconquista, came to refer to their North African possessions as the "Algarve-Beyond-the-Sea" (Algarve de Além-Mar) or the "African Algarve", in contrast with the European Algarve, now retroactively known as "Algarve-Before-the-Sea" (Algarve de Aquém-Mar). It was thus common to speak of "the Algarves" in the plural, even after the abandonment of Portugal's last North African outpost in 1769, especially in the context of the title of "King/Queen of the Algarves" held by Portuguese monarchs right up until the implantation of the Portuguese Republic, with the plural form falling into disuse since. Spanish monarchs also claim the title, though only in pretense, not laying any territorial claims on the European Algarve (although Ceuta has historically been considered part of the so-called "Algarve-Beyond-the-Sea").

== History ==
=== Pre-Roman times ===
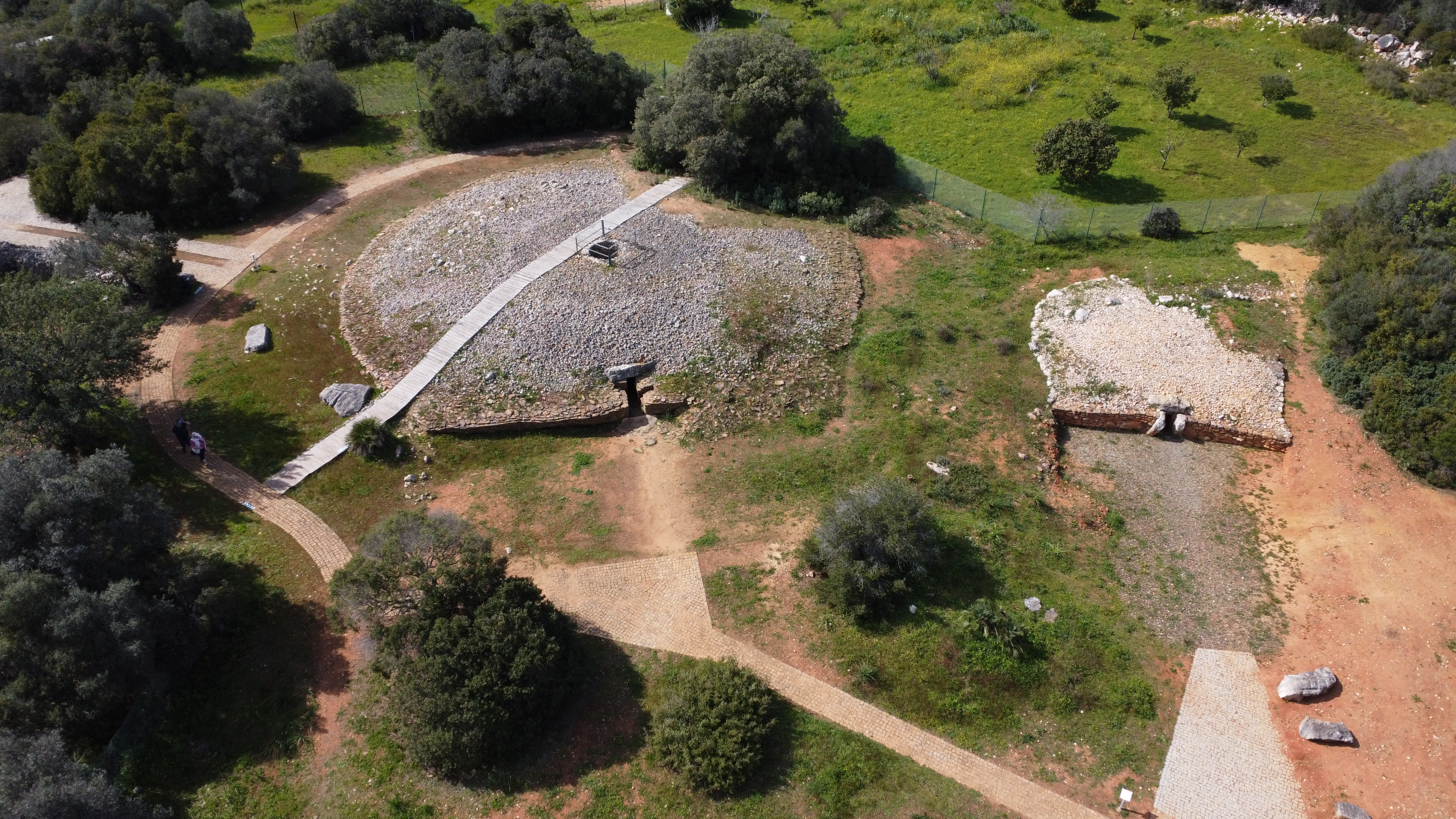
The Megalithic Monuments of Alcalar in Mexilhoeira Grande, dating back to the 3rd millennium BC

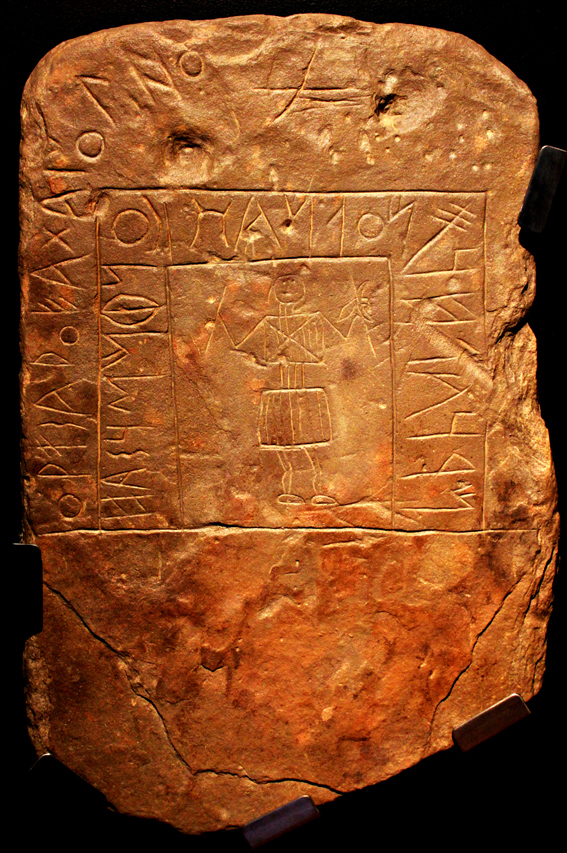
Conii script, 8th century BC

Human presence in southern Portugal dates back to the Paleolithic and Neolithic periods. The presence of megalithic stones in the area of Vila do Bispo, Lagos, Alcoutim and elsewhere in the region attests to this presence.

At around the year 1000 BC, the Phoenicians founded the city of Cádiz, and, subsequently, coastal ports along the Algarve coast. By the time of the Carthaginians, Portus Hannibalis – located in what is today either the city of Portimão or the town of Alvor in the Algarve – is named after Hannibal Barca. The Cynetes, as they were known in Greek, Conii, in Latin, were established by the sixth century BC in the region of the Algarve (called Cyneticum). Their ethnic and linguistic origins remain widely disputed, although, due to geographical proximity, it is possible that they were related both to Tartessos and the Celtici, seeing that Conii, the likely designation they used to describe themselves, is derived of the Proto-Celtic kwon ('dog'). These Indo-European tribes, Celtic or pre-Celtic, created a settlement in Lacóbriga (today's Lagos) in the year 1899 BC.

=== Roman period ===
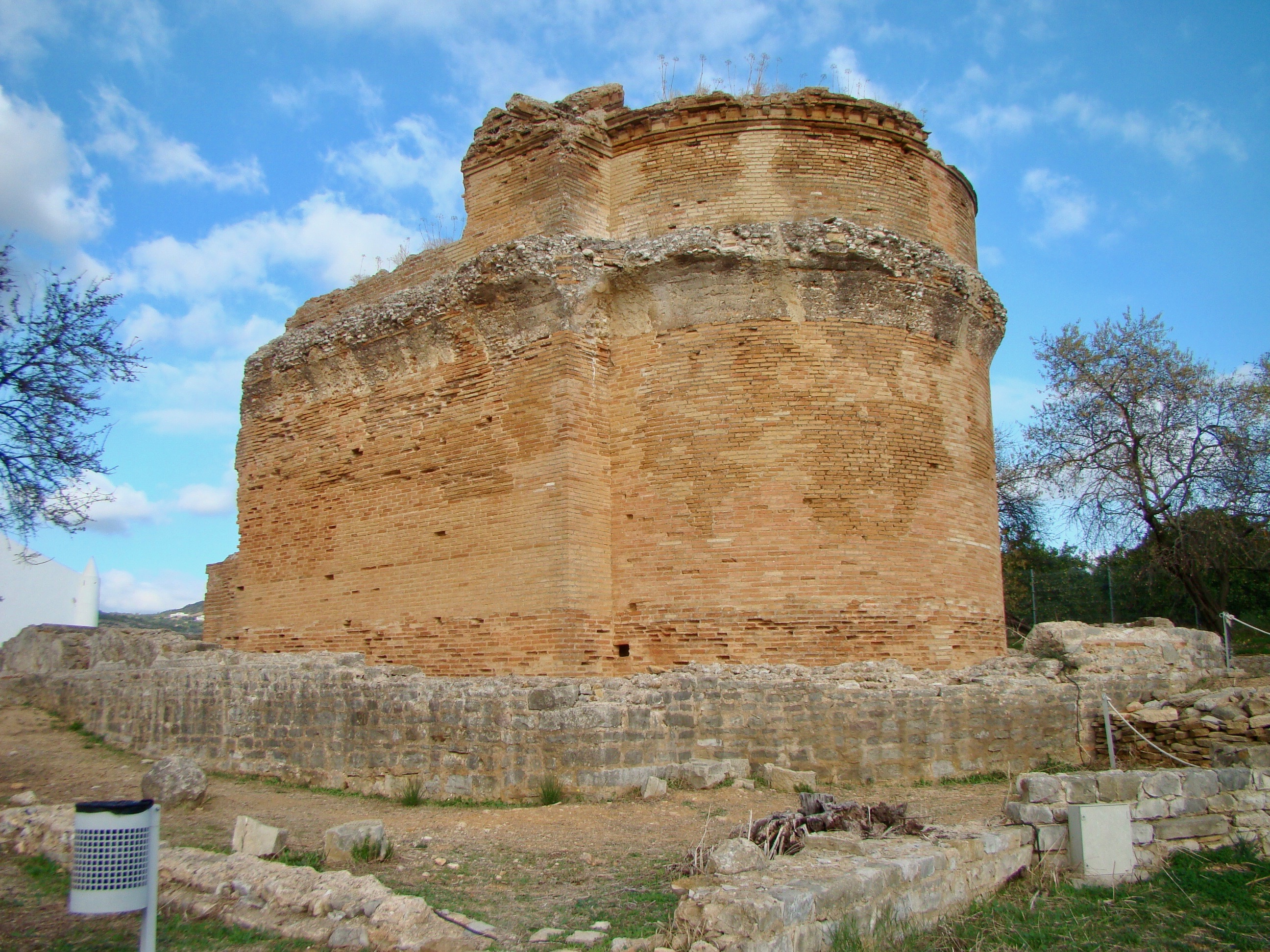
The Roman temple of Milreu in Estói

The Algarve region came under Roman control after Fabius Maximus Servilianus defeated the Lusitanians and the Turduli in the context of the Lusitanian War, as was the case of much of the Iberian Peninsula, which was absorbed into the Roman Republic in the second century BC. Cyneticum (in reference to the Cynetes who inhabited the region), as it was then called, became integrated into Hispania Ulterior and into Lusitania afterwards, being under Roman influence for around 600 years (from 200 BC till 410 AD), having thus adopted Latin as the official language, as well as Roman cultural, political, architectonic, religious, and economic tenets.

Seeing that during this time traveling through the land was dangerous, its geography meant that Cyneticum was of crucial importance as a passageway between the Mediterranean and the Atlantic Ocean, connecting countless Roman ports to several provinces, mainly in other parts of Hispania, Gaul and Britannia. This meant that the region experienced a great level of prosperity accrued through an expansion of its trading and commercial capabilities, mainly from the production and commercialization of olive oil and garum, products very much sought after throughout the Roman Empire.

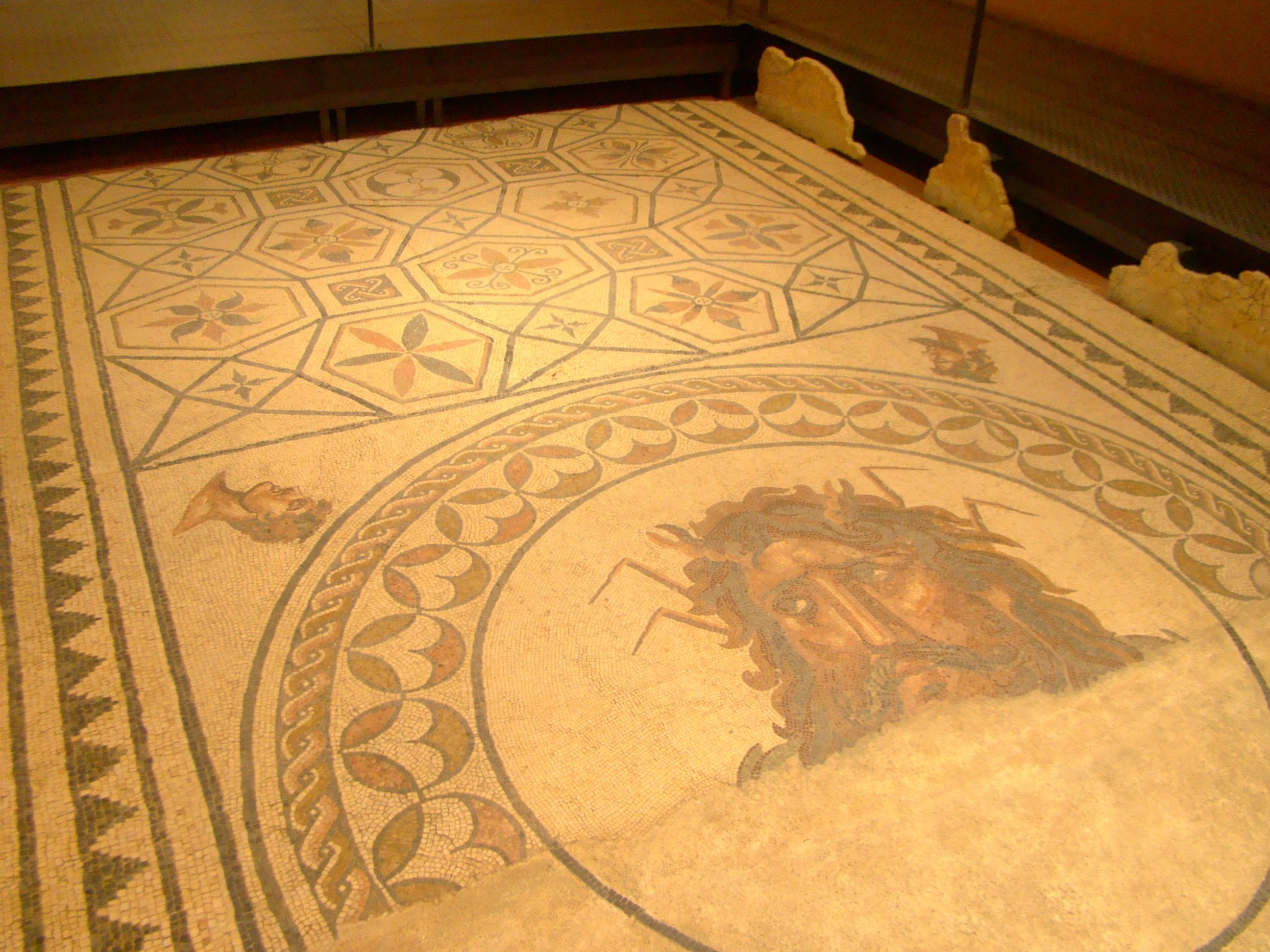
Mosaic of Roman God Oceanus, found in Ossonoba, modern day Faro

As Christianity rose in popularity, becoming the official religion of the Roman Empire under Constantine the Great, Cyneticum, following the same tendency of the rest of the Roman provinces, made the transition from a polytheistic society into a monotheistic one. The region made a gradual changeover into Christianity, as Pagan and Animistic religions became obsolete under this new cultural influence. Roman Emperor Theodosius I, himself a native of the Iberian Peninsula, would come to prohibit Paganism in 381. The Roman Temple of Milreu, originally dedicated to Venus, transformed later on into a Paleochristian temple, is an example of the religious changes that took place in this period.

Many Roman ruins, both in the form of temples, countryside villas (of which more than 30 were found in the Algarve), public baths, bridges, salting and fish-processing facilities and mosaics are widespread all over the region, notably in Vila do Bispo, Lagos, Portimão, Quarteira, Faro, Olhão, Tavira and in other areas, illustrating the strong contributions that Roman culture as a whole made to the Algarve.

=== Medieval period ===
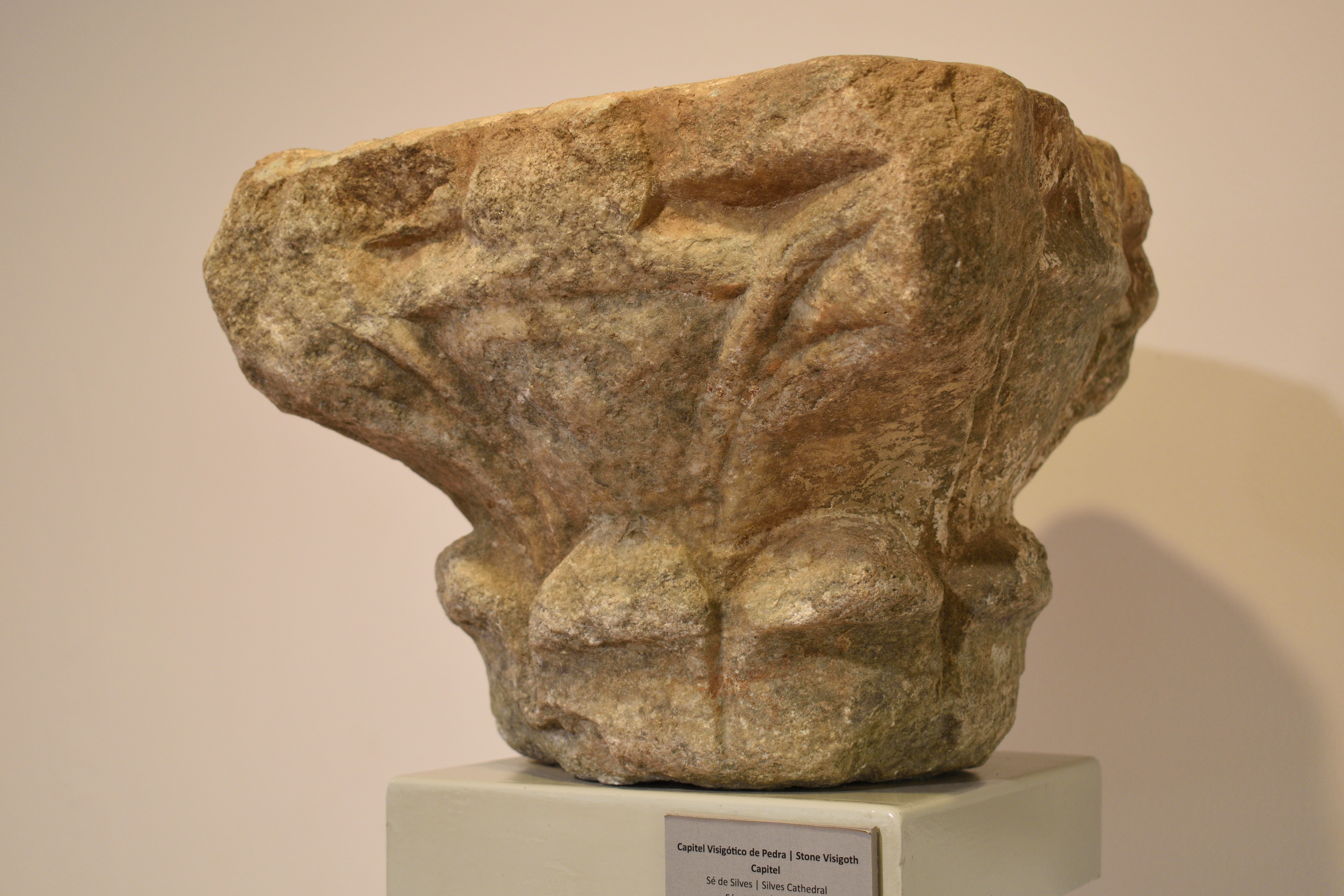
A Visigothic capital found in Silves

After the fall of the Western Roman Empire, the Visigoths, a Germanic tribe originally from Scandinavia but who had spread into Eastern Europe, occupied the Iberian Peninsula around the year 500. With the death of Amalaric in 531, the original dynastic shape of the Visigoths came to an end, and out of the fusion of the Roman and Germanic components a new Iberian identity came into being. The Visigothic Kingdom was thus founded in 542, with Toledo as its capital. Practicing Arianism at first, a large portion of the Visigoths eventually adopted Catholicism to secure their position in the region. In 552, the Algarve was conquered by the Byzantine Empire and, in 571, Liuvigild managed to secure the region for the Visigothic Kingdom once again, which lasted until the year 711 (which was the starting date of the Umayyad conquest of the Visigothic Kingdom), and comprised most of the Iberian Peninsula and parts of modern France.

The city of Silves, the first capital of the Algarve and an example of the noticeable Moorish influence in the region

When the Moors conquered Lagos in 716, it was renamed Zawala or Zawaia (lakes or wells). Faro, which the Christian residents had called Santa Maria, was renamed Faaron, from Arabic: هَارُون, romanized: hārūn, named after a local Muslim chieftain. Due to the conquest of the Iberian Peninsula, the region was called Gharb Al-Andalus: Gharb means "the west", while al-Andalus is the Arabic name for the Iberian Peninsula. As the westernmost region to be conquered by the Moors, the coveted lands of the Algarve, in this corner of Europe, became for a while the end goal of the Muslim Empire's expansionist policy. With the advent of Moorish rule in the eighth century, Faro, called Ossonoba by then, retained its status as the most important town in the southwest corner of the Iberian Peninsula. In the 9th century, after a revolt led by Yahia Ben Bakr who was succeeded in office by his son, Bakr Ben Yahia, it became the capital of a short-lived autonomous princedom and was fortified with a ring of defensive walls. At this time, in the 10th century, the name Santa Maria began to be used instead of Ossonoba. By the 11th century, the town was known as Santa Maria Ibn Harun. During the Moorish era (9-12th century), Silves was a major stronghold, and the town prospered greatly as the capital of the region. In the mid-13th century, during the Reconquista, the Kingdom of Portugal took over the region in a series of successful military campaigns against the Moors. Al-Gharb became the Kingdom of Algarve, and the non-assimilated Muslim Moors who didn't flee the region would be expelled in 1496 not only in the Algarve but in all of Portugal. As the southernmost region to be conquered by the Portuguese, the coveted territory had become for a while the end goal of the Kingdom of Portugal's expansionist policy known as Reconquista and by itself one of the reasons behind the foundation of Portugal. There were subsequent Moorish attempts to recapture the region, without success.

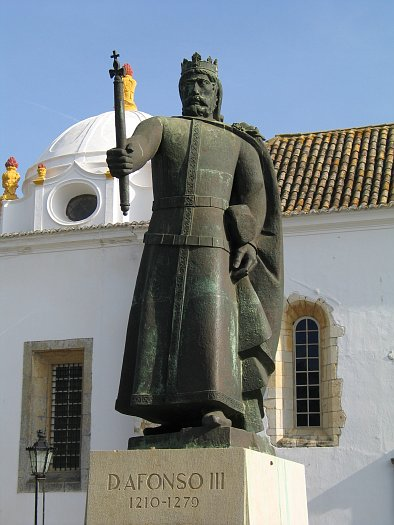
Statue of King Afonso III of Portugal in Faro, Algarve, Portugal

King Afonso III of Portugal started calling himself King of Portugal and the Algarve. The most outstanding fact of his reign was indeed the definitive conquest of the Algarve. Silves was taken from its last Muslim ruler Ibn Afan by Paio Peres Correia, Grand-Master of the Order of Santiago in 1242 and Tavira was also taken in the same year after Alentejo and most of the coast of the Algarve (then part of a historical region called Gharb al-Andalus by the Muslims of Iberian Peninsula) had already fallen in 1238. In March 1249, the city of Faro was conquered. From this date, Afonso III became the first Portuguese king to use the title King of Portugal and the Algarve. The friars of Sant'Iago and Calatrava played a decisive role, and were entrusted with the task of concluding the conquest. The conquest of the Algarve led, however, to serious disagreements with the Kingdom of Castile. Peace was initially achieved with the marriage of King Afonso III to Beatrice of Castile, illegitimate daughter of King Alfonso X of Castile (after the pope had annulled the marriage to Matilda II because she was sterile), but the problem was only definitively solved by the Treaty of Badajoz, of 16 February 1267. By this treaty it was defined that the Guadiana river, from the confluence of the Caia until the mouth, would be the Portugal-Castile border.

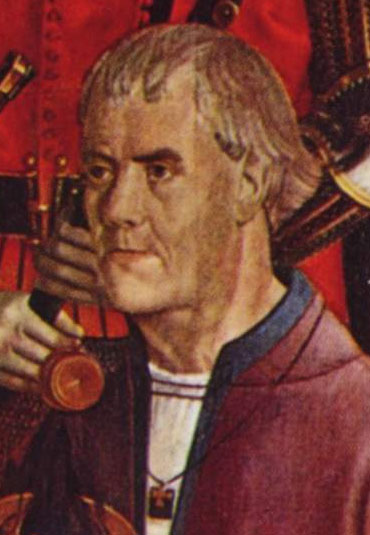
Portrait of Henry the Navigator who based himself near Lagos, in the Algarve, and conducted various maritime expeditions

After 1471, with the conquest of several territories in the Maghreb – the area considered an extension of the Algarve – Afonso V of Portugal began fashioning himself "King of Portugal and the Algarves", referring to the European and African possessions (Algarves is the plural word of Algarve and means the Algarve plus all the overseas territories that Portugal would conquer abroad further south). The over five centuries-long Moorish rule over the Algarve (and Alentejo), left their mark and added to a unique blend of architectonic, gastronomical and artistic features like the traditional Algarve corridinho, a folk dance found in this southernmost region of Portugal. In the 15th century, Prince Henry the Navigator based himself near Lagos and conducted various maritime expeditions which established the colonies that comprised the Portuguese Empire. Also from Lagos, Gil Eanes set sail in 1434 to become the first seafarer to round Cape Bojador in West Africa. The voyages of discovery brought Lagos fame and fortune. Trade flourished and Lagos became the capital of the historical province of Algarve in 1577 and remained so until the fabled 1755 Lisbon earthquake.

=== Modern times ===
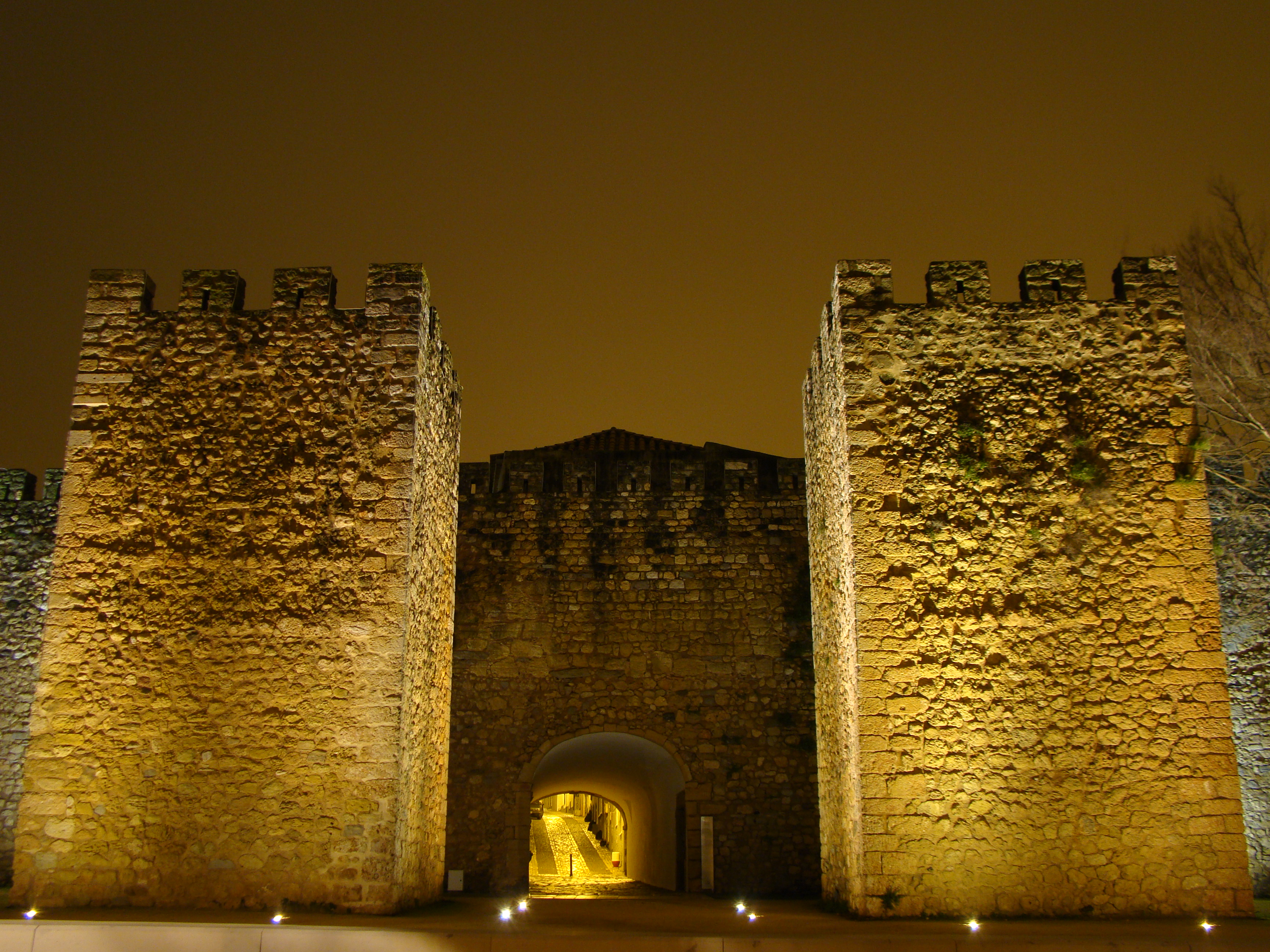
The walls of the ancient town of Lagos which was almost completely destroyed during the 1755 earthquake

After the destructive effects of an earlier major earthquake in 1722, the 1755 earthquake damaged many areas in the Algarve and an accompanying tsunami destroyed or damaged coastal fortresses, while coastal towns and villages were heavily damaged except Faro, which was protected by the sandy banks of Ria Formosa lagoon. In Lagos, the waves reached the top of the city walls. For many Portuguese coastal regions, including the Algarve, the destructive effects of the tsunami were more disastrous than those of the earthquake itself. Prior to the independence of Brazil, "United Kingdom of Portugal, Brazil, and the Algarves" (1815–1822) was an official designation for Portugal which also alluded to the Algarve. After the independence of Brazil in 1822, Portuguese monarchs continued to use the title of "King of Portugal and the Algarves" until the proclamation of the First Portuguese Republic in 1910.

Estácio da Veiga's 1878 archeological map of the Algarve

In 1807, while Jean-Andoche Junot led the first Napoleonic invasion in the north of Portugal, the Algarve was occupied by Spanish troops under Manuel Godoy. Beginning in 1808, and after subsequent battles in various towns and villages, the region was the first to drive out the Spanish occupiers. During the Portuguese Civil War (1828–1834), several battles took place in the region, especially the battle of Cape St. Vicente and the battle of Sant’Ana, between liberals and Miguelites (antiliberal absolutists). Remexido was the guerrilla Algarvian leader who stood with the Miguelite absolutists for years, until he was executed in Faro in 1838. As the first canned fish undertaking in the country, the Vila Real de Santo António plant of the company Conservas Ramirez (founded in 1853) became the cradle of the sector in Portugal. Vila Real de Santo António and other places in coastal Algarve thrived on the growth of the fishing industry, which included the processing of species of tuna and sardine.

Cork as a material used by people is a very old product. Throughout times, Portugal became the world's largest producer of cork, with the Algarve and some areas of the neighboring Portuguese region of Alentejo producing world-renowned high-quality cork (50% of the world's cork production comes from Portugal, and cork is one of the country's main exports in modern times, but large-scale use of the material by the Portuguese goes back to the 14th century, when Portuguese explorers used cork in the construction of their ships because one of the properties of cork is that it does not rot). At one time, between the late 19th century and the beginning of the 20th century, São Brás de Alportel, in Sotavento Algarvio, was the center of cork production in the Algarve, with 80 factories in operation, but gradually the industry moved to the center and northern regions of Portugal, and only a few cork factories remained in São Brás de Alportel municipality. Starting in the late 19th century, Silves Municipality, in Barlavento Algarvio, used to be another area with a large production of the valuable cork and that industry would prosper until the 1930s (by 2010, the cork industry had disappeared in the area but Silves had a museum showing how cork was harvested and processed in the old days when it was a major center of that industry, a museum opened in 1999 that in 2001 won the prestigious award for Best Museum of Industry in Europe). The establishment of the First Portuguese Republic in 1910 marked the end of the almost nominal Kingdom of Portugal and the Algarve.

By the 1950s, as air traveling became more accessible, the Mediterranean Basin increasingly developed into a hot-spot for international tourism. Regions such as the Algarve benefited economically from this trend. The Algarve was proclaimed "Europe's best travel bargain" in an article from the 23 October 1964 issue of LIFE.

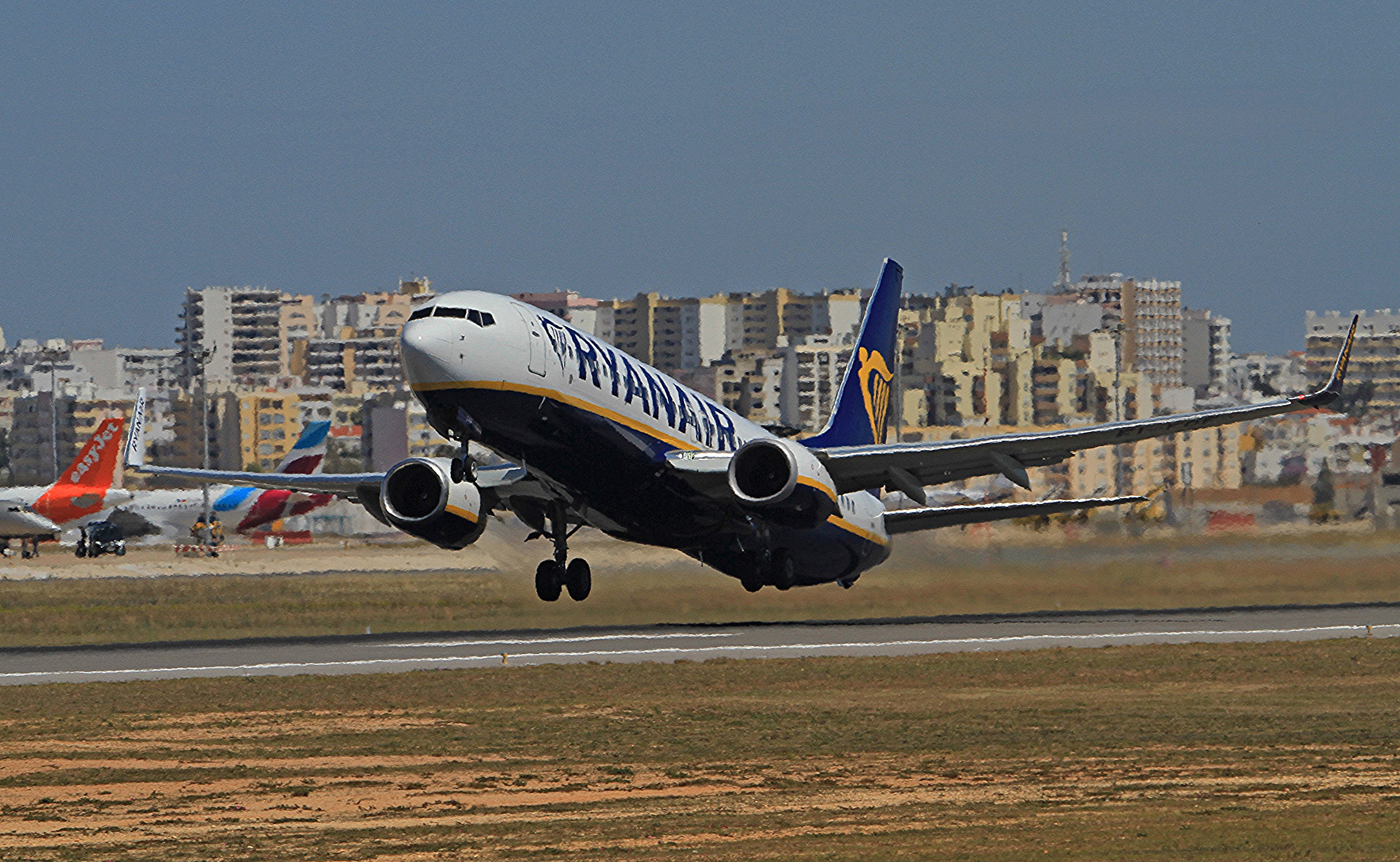
Opened in July 1965, Faro International Airport became a hub for the first time in March 2010 when Ryanair decided to base many of its aircraft there.

In the Algarve, from 1962 to 1966 and beyond, the mutation of tourism is visible in the new tourist accommodation developments. Hotels play a secondary role, in favor of apartment buildings, extended villas (some with golf course, many with swimming pool) and village complexes. After years of planning and construction work in progress, the Faro International Airport was inaugurated on 11 July 1965, by the President of the Republic Américo Tomás. The access road, between the national road EN125 and the newly built airport, was also opened to the public at the same time. However, tourism services were unprepared for this rapid change. The formation of an accommodation supply outside the framework of tourism legislation and the incapacity of public regulation of the tourism supply begins and would be a reality until the 1990s. This somewhat chaotic tourism boom made the tourist industry the biggest contributor to the economy of Algarve and the largest employer in the region. Starting as a fast-paced tourism urbanization hotspot between the 1960s and 1990s, the Algarve had morphed itself into a seasonal metropolis by the 2010s.

During the process, the Algarve has remained anyway a fairly exotic region for Portuguese citizens from other regions in mainland Portugal due to its Mediterranean climate, unique foods, architecture and geographical location – in modern times many Portuguese residing in other parts of the country traditionally spend their summer break or own a holiday home in Algarve. The state-run University of Algarve was founded in January 1979 and for the Fall 2021 semester had about 9,000 students enrolled. Its medical school opened in 2009. In 1991, the construction of the A22 motorway (also known as Via Infante de Sagres, named so after Henry the Navigator) which crosses the Algarve from west to east began and by 2003 it was fully completed. It connects Lagos in western Algarve to the Guadiana International Bridge over the Portugal-Spain international river border in eastern Algarve.

== Geography ==
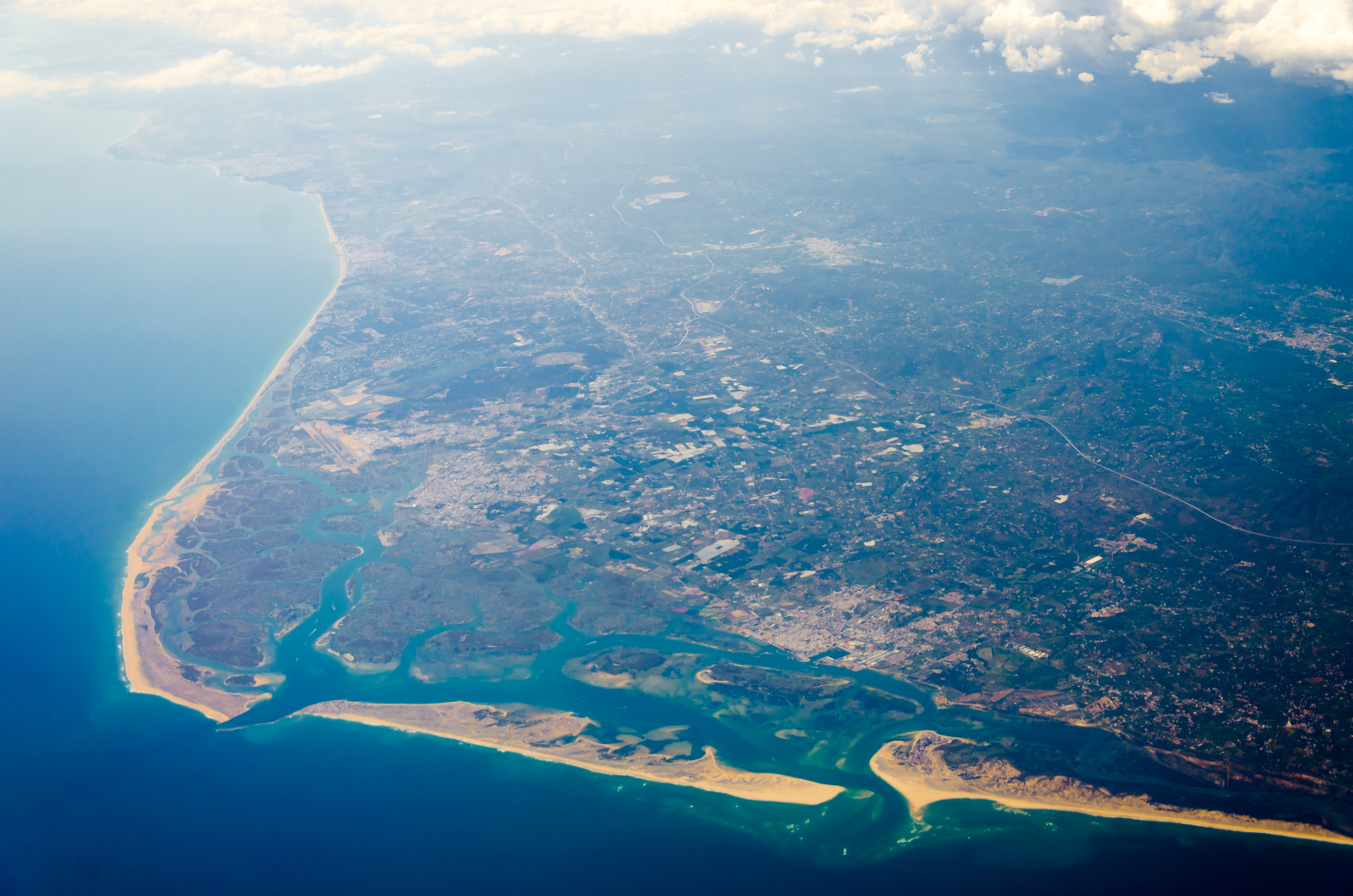
Aerial view of Ria Formosa

The Algarve is located in the southernmost area of continental Portugal and the southwesternmost area of the Iberian Peninsula and mainland Europe, covering an area of 4,997 km^{2} (1,929 sq mi). It borders to the north with the Alentejo region (Alentejo Litoral and Baixo Alentejo), to the south and west with the Atlantic Ocean, and to the east the Guadiana River marks the border with Spain. The highest point is located northwest in the Monchique mountains, with a maximum altitude of 902 m (2,959 ft) on Pico da Fóia.

The western part of the Algarve is known as Barlavento and the east as Sotavento. The name is undoubtedly due to the prevailing wind on the south coast of the Algarve but the historical origin of these divisions is uncertain and quite remote. Barlavento and Sotavento both have eight municipalities and one main city (Faro in Sotavento and Portimão in Barlavento). Cape St. Vincent is the most western point of the Algarve.

The region is also home to the Ria Formosa Lagoon, a nature reserve of over 170 km^{2} (66 sq mi) and a stopping place for hundreds of different species of birds. This system of barrier islands communicates with the sea through six inlets. The length of the south-facing coastline is roughly 155 km (96 mi). Beyond the westernmost point of Cape St. Vincent it stretches a further 50 km (31 mi) to the north. The coastline is notable for picturesque limestone caves and grottoes by the sea, particularly around Lagos, Portimão, Lagoa and Albufeira, which are accessible by powerboat.

Researchers agree that the Lisbon metropolitan area and the Algarve are the two regions in mainland Portugal most at risk of experiencing earthquakes and tsunamis strong enough to cause catastrophic loss of human life and infrastructure. Two earthquakes in the 18th century were the last time such catastrophic events occurred in the Algarve – the 1722 Algarve earthquake and the 1755 Lisbon earthquake.

=== Climate ===
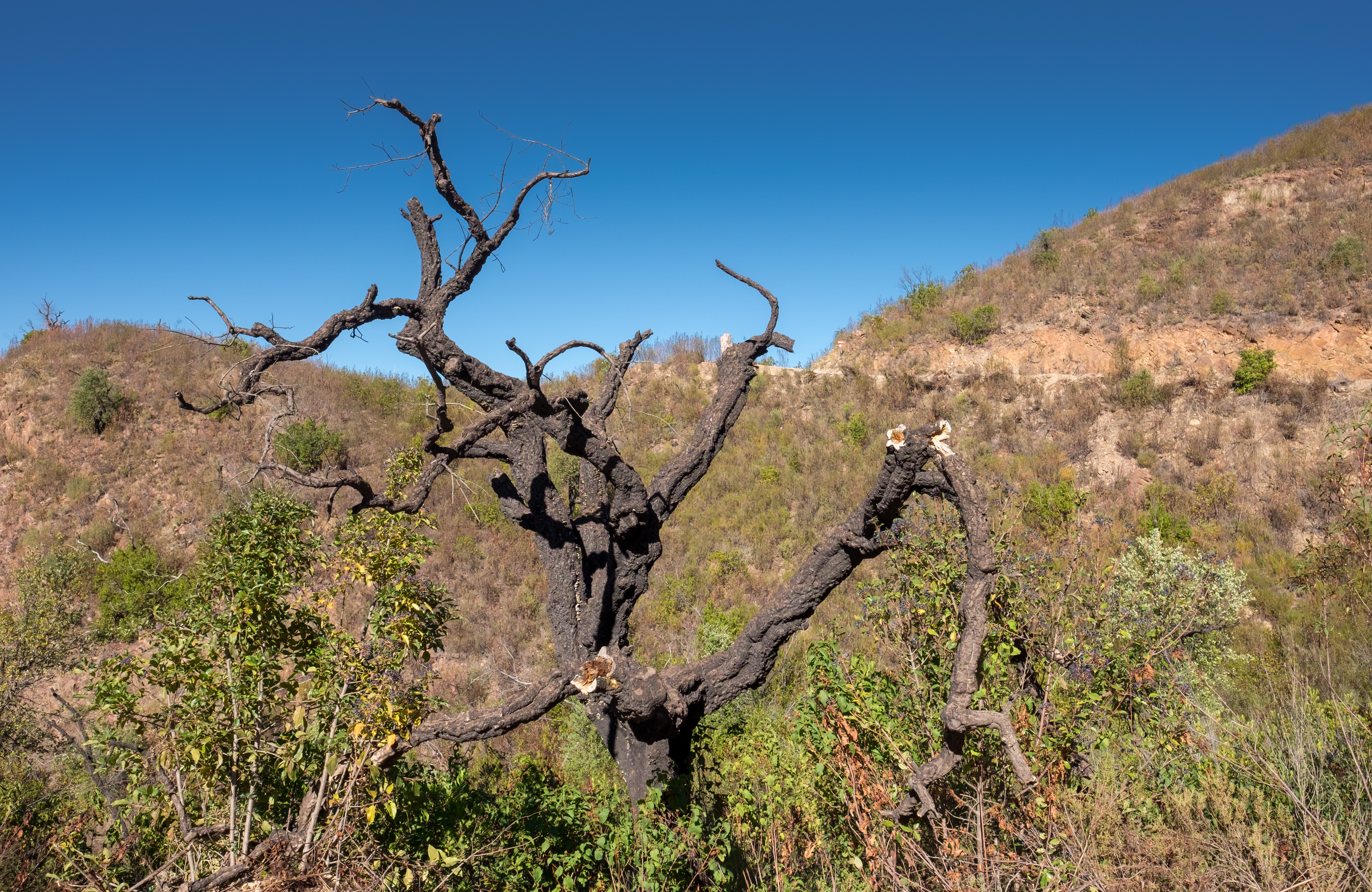
In the summer, droughts and very high temperature spells in the interior Algarve often result in wildfires.

The Algarve as a whole is one of the warmest places of Southern Europe, with an Atlantic influenced Mediterranean climate, it has mild wet winters and warm to very hot, dry summers. It is overall the sunniest region in Europe, with annual sunshine values ranging from 2600 h in the Monchique Range, to values well above 3100 h on the southern coast.

Generally, winter sees only subtle differences in daily maxima along the coast, mostly between 16 and 17 °C (61 and 63 °F), though temperatures as high as 25 °C (77 °F) have been recorded. Conversely, overnight lows are higher in the west, with Sagres and Vila do Bispo averaging 9–10 °C (48–50 °F), whilst to the east, averages are lower and 7–8 °C (45–46 °F) is more common. Temperatures very rarely fall below freezing (< 0 °C (32 °F)). On the interior, nights are usually cooler, averaging 4–5 °C (39–41 °F).

Summer sees its highest average temperatures in the east, where the maxima ranges from 29–30 °C (84–86 °F) in the coast and 32–35 °C (90–95 °F) in the interior. Daily temperatures in the Vicentine Coast are much cooler, usually 24–25 °C (75–77 °F) maxima, consequence of the strong upwelling western Portugal experiences. The Algarvian interior can get very hot in the summer, temperatures above 40 °C (104 °F) are not uncommon. Overnight lows are often independent of the location, around 16–20 °C (61–68 °F) in most of the Algarve.

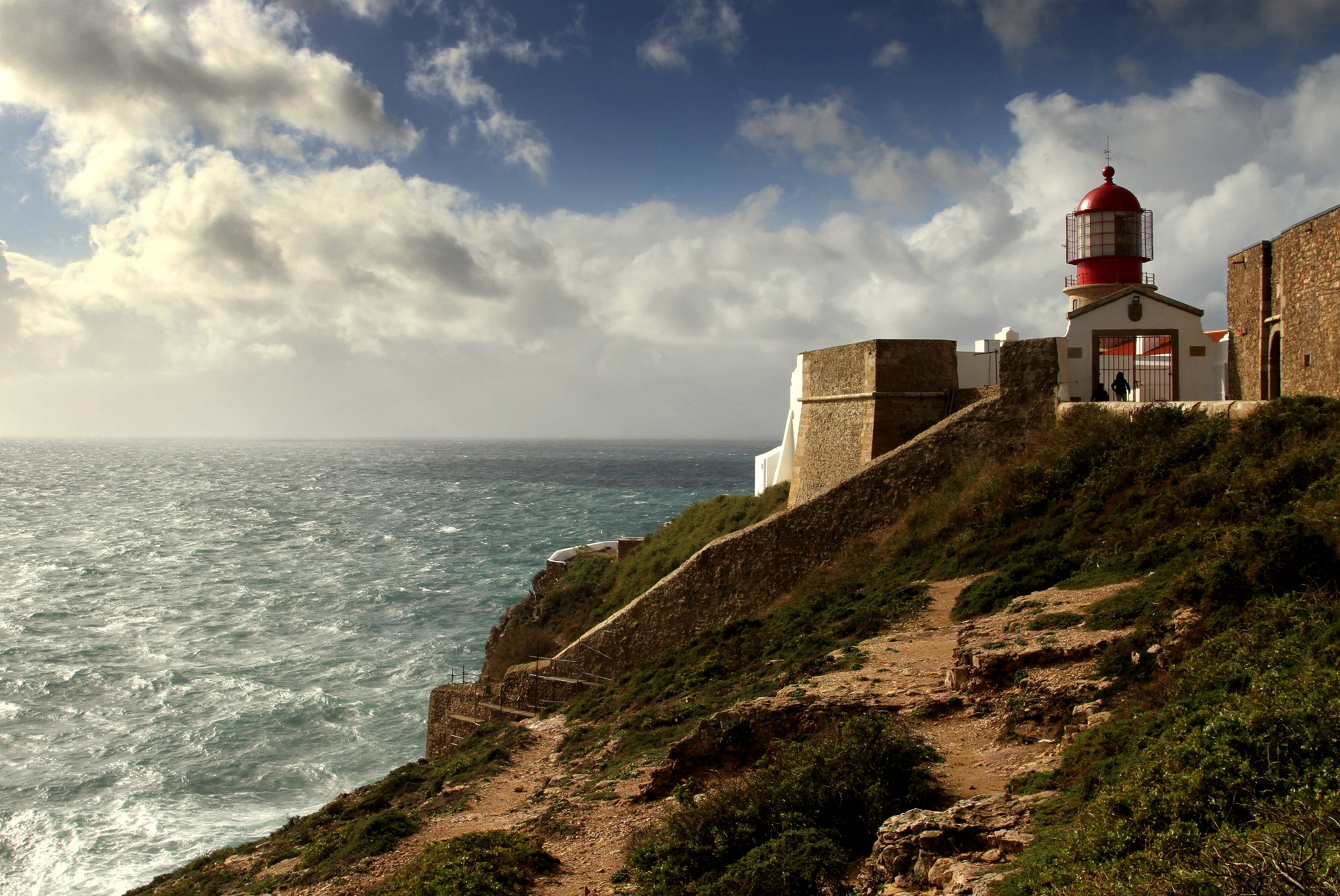
Cape St. Vincent, Europe's southwesternmost point, has a dry and very moderate climate (temperatures usually vary between 13 and 19 °C (55 and 66 °F) throughout the year).

The Algarve gets between 450 and 1,200 mm (18 and 47 in) of precipitation per year on average. December is the wettest month and July is the driest. The overall precipitation is determined mostly by the precipitation received in the winter (summers are very dry in most of the region). It has its highest values in the mountainous interior, and its lowest on the far east (in the Guadiana Valley) and the southwest (Sagres Point and Cape St. Vincent).

Sea-surface temperatures in the Algarve are generally cool, though milder than the remaining west-facing coasts of Portugal. Around the Sagres Point, the upwelling phenomena further decreases surface ocean temperatures. In the winter, both western and southern coasts average sea-surface temperatures of around 15–16 °C (59–61 °F). In the summer, it rises to around 20–21 °C (68–70 °F), with their highest in September; however, southern coastal waters near the Gulf of Cádiz tend to have slightly higher temperatures on average than the western Vicentine Coast.

Climate data for Faro (FAO)
Month	Jan	Feb	Mar	Apr	May	Jun	Jul	Aug	Sep	Oct	Nov	Dec	Year
Record high °C (°F)	21.9 (71.4)	24.7 (76.5)	28.9 (84.0)	30.1 (86.2)	33.6 (92.5)	37.1 (98.8)	44.3 (111.7)	39.6 (103.3)	37.4 (99.3)	33.3 (91.9)	28.6 (83.5)	24.0 (75.2)	44.3 (111.7)
Mean daily maximum °C (°F)	16.1 (61.0)	16.9 (62.4)	19.1 (66.4)	20.4 (68.7)	22.8 (73.0)	26.4 (79.5)	29.2 (84.6)	28.8 (83.8)	26.6 (79.9)	23.2 (73.8)	19.6 (67.3)	17.0 (62.6)	22.2 (72.0)
Daily mean °C (°F)	12.0 (53.6)	12.8 (55.0)	14.8 (58.6)	16.1 (61.0)	18.4 (65.1)	21.9 (71.4)	24.2 (75.6)	24.1 (75.4)	22.3 (72.1)	19.3 (66.7)	15.7 (60.3)	13.3 (55.9)	17.9 (64.2)
Mean daily minimum °C (°F)	7.9 (46.2)	8.7 (47.7)	10.5 (50.9)	11.8 (53.2)	14.0 (57.2)	17.3 (63.1)	19.1 (66.4)	19.4 (66.9)	18.0 (64.4)	15.3 (59.5)	11.7 (53.1)	9.6 (49.3)	13.6 (56.5)
Record low °C (°F)	−1.2 (29.8)	−1.2 (29.8)	2.3 (36.1)	3.6 (38.5)	6.7 (44.1)	8.0 (46.4)	11.9 (53.4)	13.1 (55.6)	9.9 (49.8)	7.8 (46.0)	2.7 (36.9)	1.2 (34.2)	−1.2 (29.8)
Average precipitation mm (inches)	59.3 (2.33)	52.0 (2.05)	39.4 (1.55)	38.6 (1.52)	21.7 (0.85)	4.3 (0.17)	1.8 (0.07)	3.9 (0.15)	23.2 (0.91)	60.1 (2.37)	90.4 (3.56)	114.1 (4.49)	508.8 (20.03)
Average precipitation days (≥ 0.1 mm)	11	12	8	10	7	4	1	2	4	9	10	13	91
Mean monthly sunshine hours	182.1	172.0	242.6	253.6	305.0	326.9	360.6	344.9	279.1	227.0	191.6	159.0	3,044.4
Percentage possible sunshine	59	56	65	64	68	74	81	82	75	65	63	53	67
Source: Instituto Português do Mar e da Atmosfera

=== Human geography ===
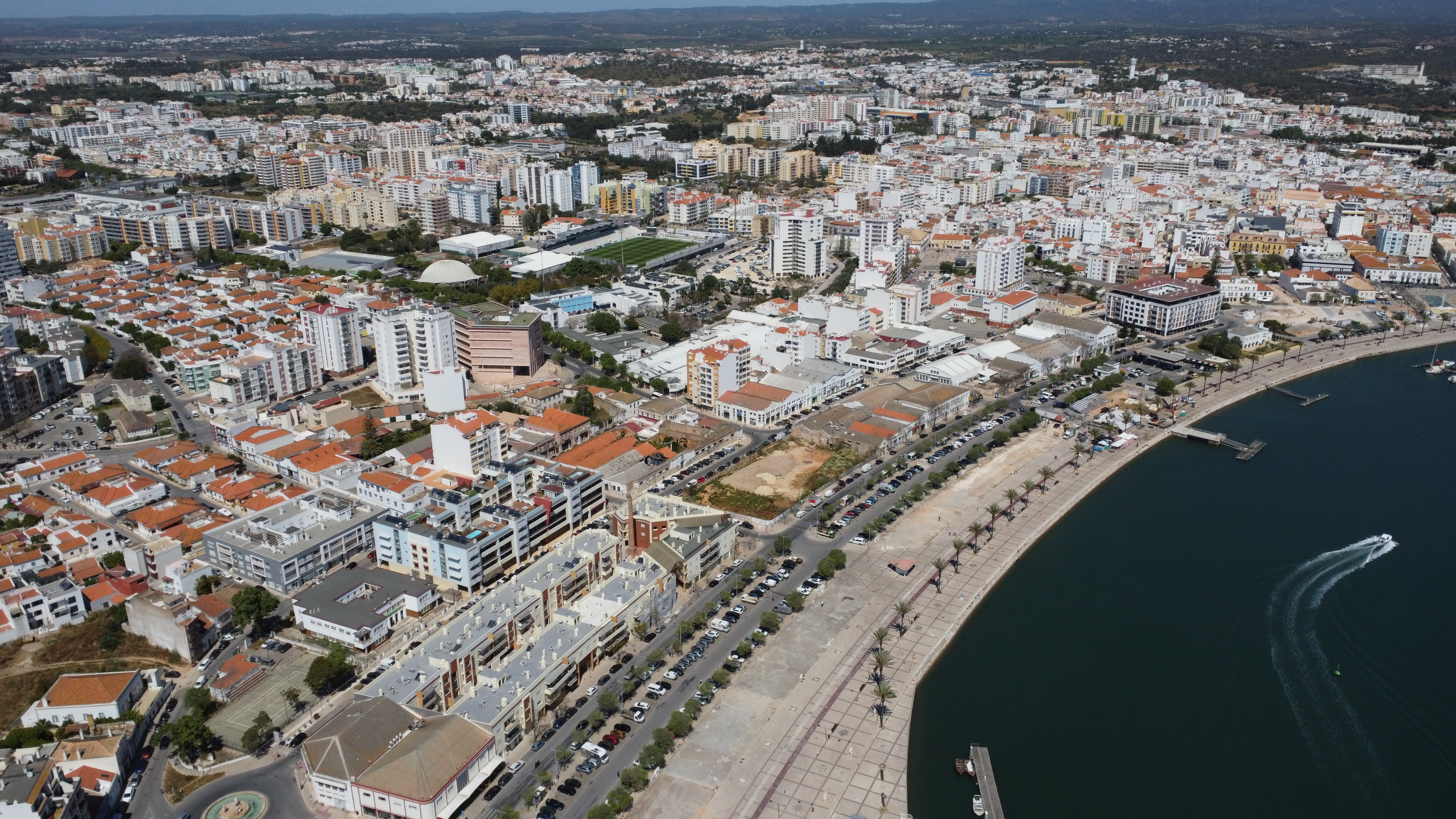
A partial view of Portimão, the second largest city of the Algarve

About 450,000 permanent inhabitants (90 residents per km^{2}) live in the area, although this figure increases to over a million people at the height of summer, due to an influx of tourists. The Algarve has several cities, towns, and villages; the region's capital is the city of Faro, while other cities include Albufeira, Lagoa, Lagos, Loulé, Olhão, Portimão, Quarteira, Silves, Tavira, and Vila Real de Santo António, in addition to various summer retreats such as Vilamoura, Praia da Rocha, Armação de Pêra, Alvor, Monte Gordo, Alcoutim, and Sagres.

Before 2004, the Faro District was the administrative unit governing the Algarve. In 2004, the Greater Metropolitan Area of the Algarve was formed, which was converted into an intermunicipal community in 2008. The Algarve is also a NUTS II and NUTS III statistical region. The intermunicipal community of the Algarve is subdivided into 16 municipalities:

Between 2001 and 2020, the Algarve was the only Portuguese region where an increase in the number of newborns was reported (4,164 babies in 2001; 4,323 babies in 2020; a rise of 3.8%). 25% of those newborns had a foreign mother. Mostly Brazilian mothers, but also a rising number of Indian, Nepalese and Pakistani mothers together with a sizable, already established former trend of Romanian, Ukrainian and Moldovan mothers.

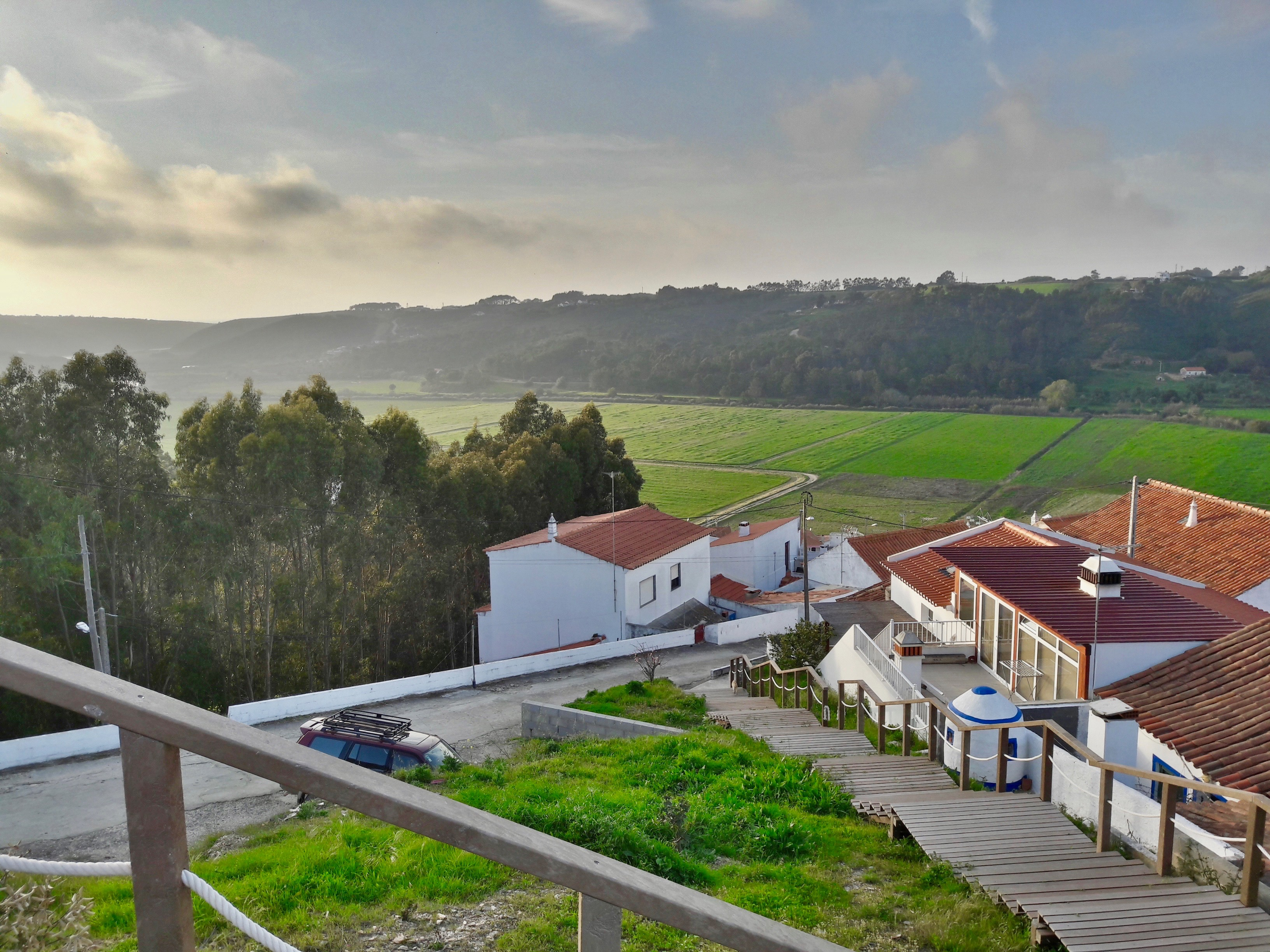
A view of Odeceixe, in the northwestern Algarve

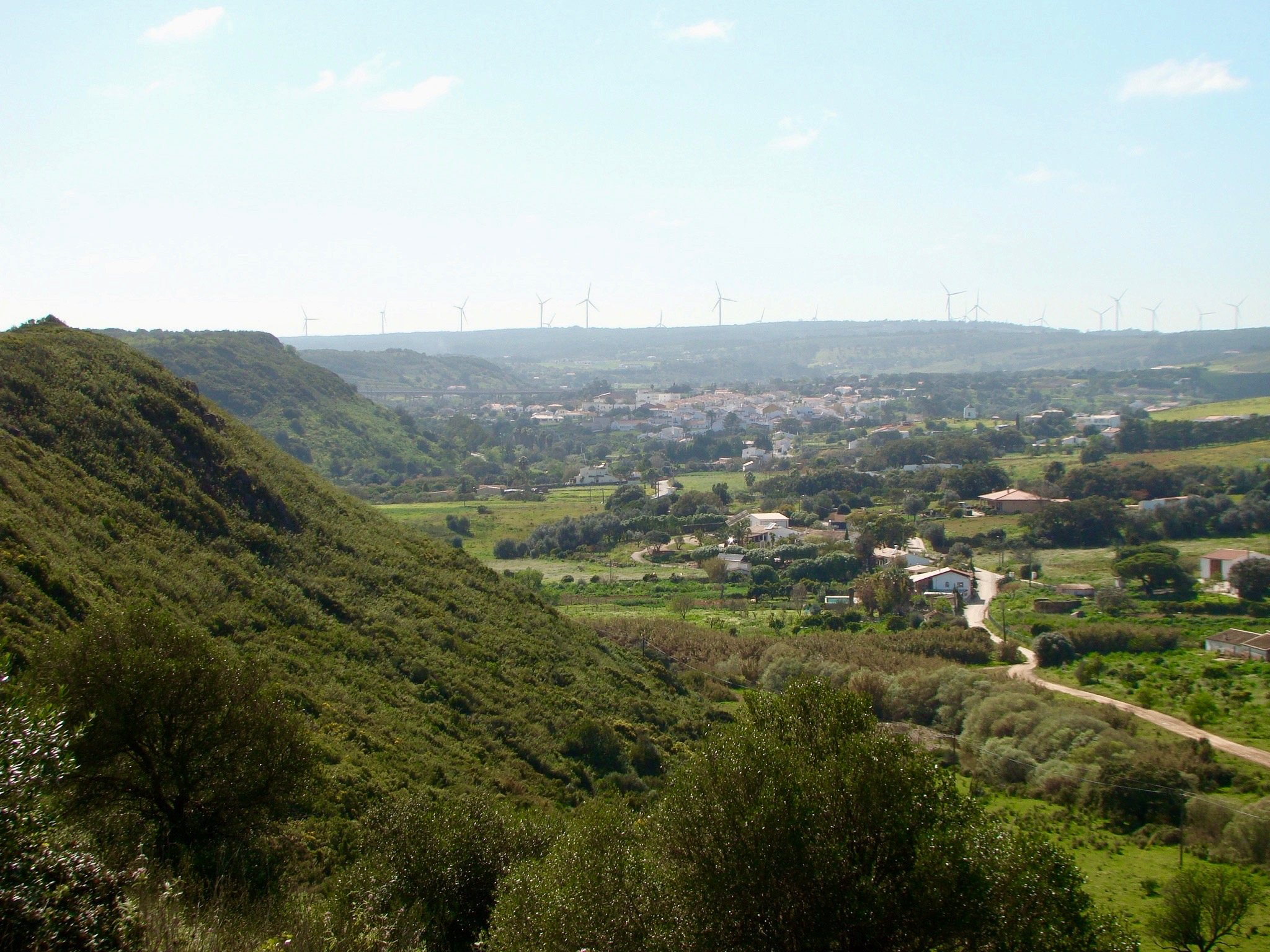
The interior of the Algarve consists of small villages and is sparsely inhabited.

Municipality	Population (2011)	Area (km^{2})
Albufeira	40,828	140.66
Alcoutim	2,917	575.36
Aljezur	5,884	323.50
Castro Marim	6,747	300.84
Faro	64,560	202.57
Lagoa	22,975	88.25
Lagos	31,049	212.99
Loulé	70,622	763.67
Monchique	6,045	395.30
Olhão	45,396	130.86
Portimão	55,614	182.06
São Brás de Alportel	10,662	153.37
Silves	37,126	680.06
Tavira	26,167	606.97
Vila do Bispo	5,258	179.06
Vila Real de Santo António	19,156	61.25
Total	451,006	4996.80

== Economy ==
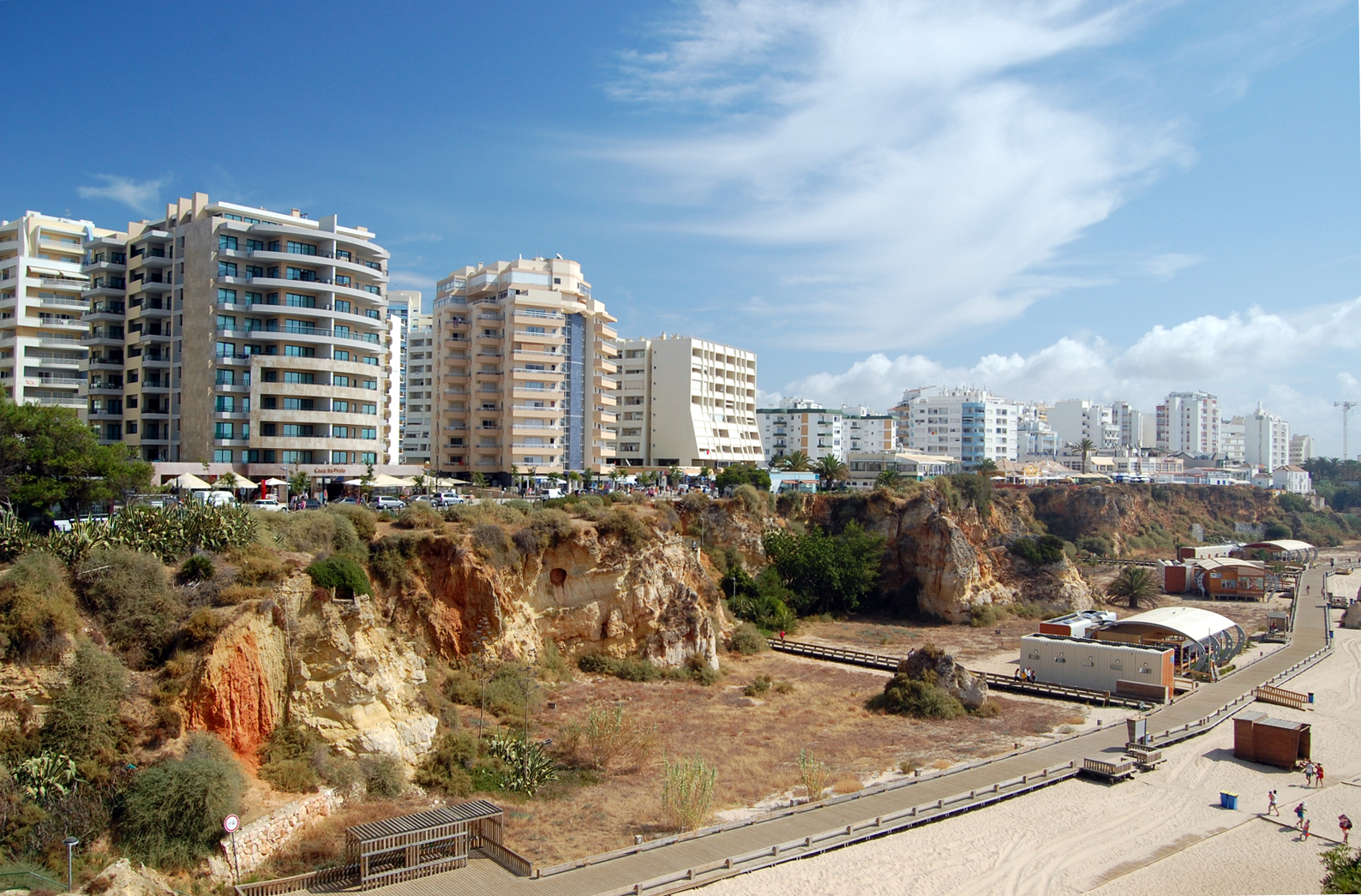
A complex of apartments overlooking the beach in Praia da Rocha, Portimão. The Algarve relies heavily on the tourism industry.

The Algarve's human development index (HDI) stands at 0.847 (2019) while Portugal's HDI average is 0.864 (2019) and Lisbon Metropolitan Area's is 0.901 (2019) – it is the 4th most developed region of Portugal out of seven regions. However, with a GDP per capita at 85.2% of the European Union average, the Algarve has the second highest purchasing power in the country, standing only behind Lisbon Metropolitan Area. Agricultural products of the region include fig, almond, orange, carob, olive, avocado and cork oak. Horticulture is important and the region's landscape is known for the large areas of land covered with greenhouses which are used to that end. Several types of fruit and veggies such as tomatoes, cauliflowers, strawberry and raspberry, are commercially grown and exported. Fishing and aquaculture are important activities in the coastal area of the Algarve, with sardines, squids, soles, cyprinids, gilt-head bream, and various seafood, including oysters and the grooved carpet shell, being the major products. The Algarve's wines are also renowned. Four wines in the region have Protected Designation of Origin (Denominação de Origem Controlada – DOC): Lagoa DOC, Lagos DOC, Portimão DOC, and Tavira DOC. Food processing, including value added products (traditional, local raw agricultural products that have been modified or enhanced to have a higher market value than before) such as innovative fig, orange, almond and carob-based products, cement (CIMPOR has a major cement plant in Loulé) and construction are the main industries. Cork, having an historical industrial tradition in Silves and São Brás de Alportel municipalities since the 19th century but in decline by the 1930s, is still used as a material for the production of several items by newer industries that make products ranging from cork stoppers to fashionware. Pelcor, headquartered in São Brás de Alportel, is the first luxury brand of fashion and lifestyle accessories in cork skin combining design, innovation and sustainability.

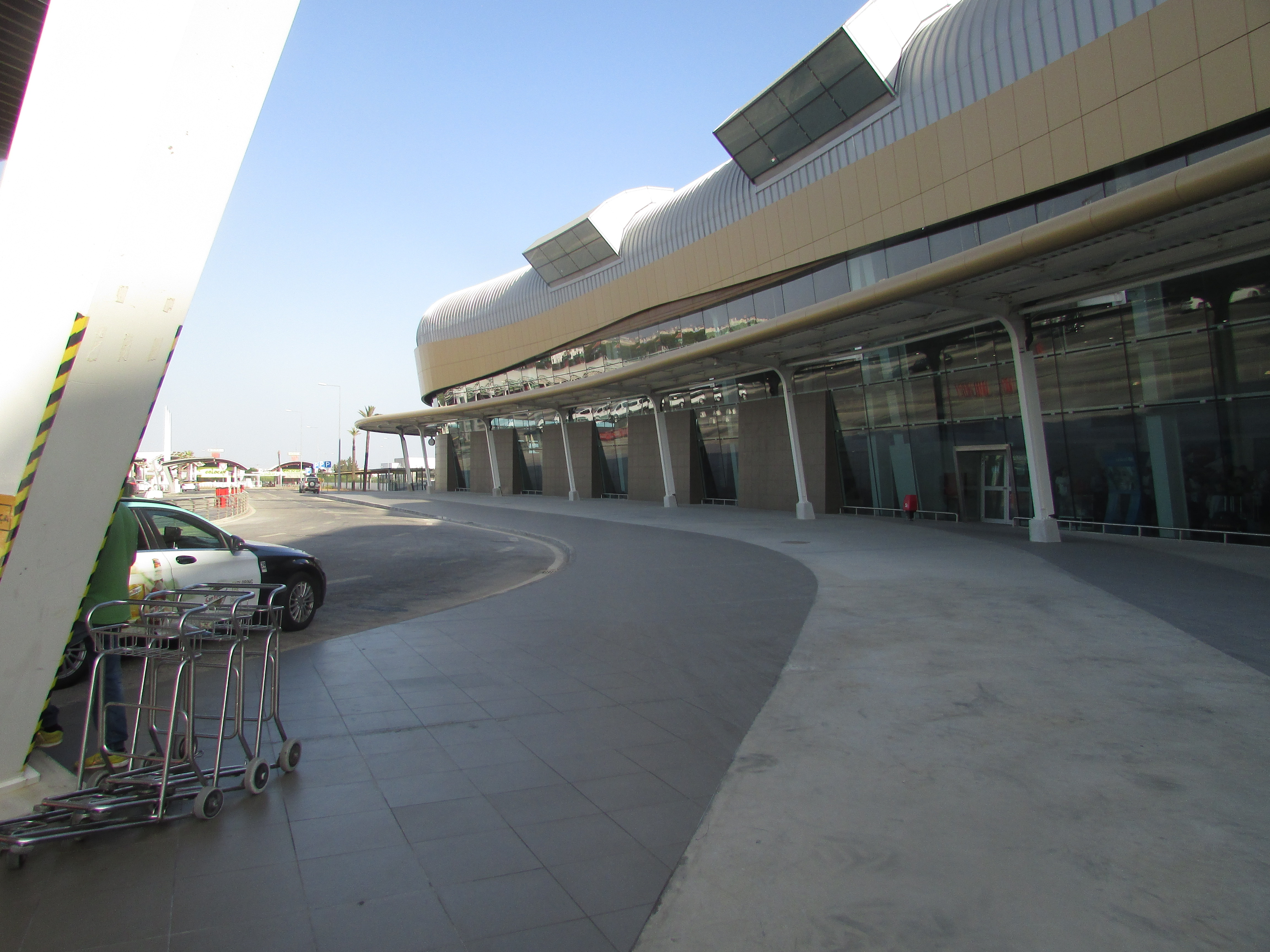
Faro International Airport

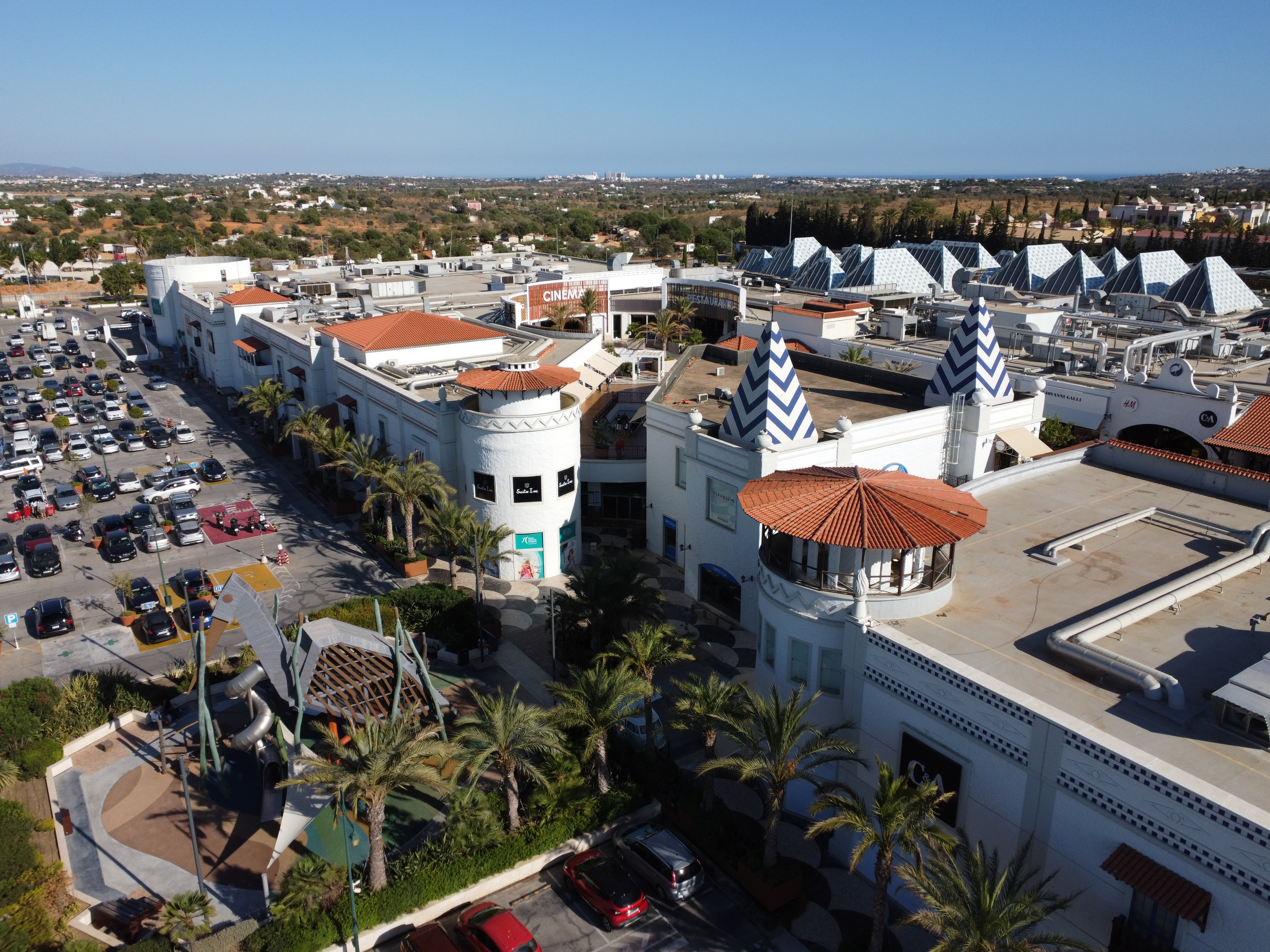
Algarve Shopping, a shopping center located in Guia, Albufeira

Tourism-related activities are extensive and make up the bulk of the Algarve's economy during summer. The Algarve's economy has always been closely linked to the sea. Fishing and fish processing have been an important activity since ancient times. This is attested by archeological evidence of garum production in Algarve during the Roman era. The oldest fish canning factory of Portugal was that of Conservas Ramirez established by Sebastian Ramirez in Vila Real de Santo António, Eastern Algarve in 1853, but the long-established fish canning industry entered in decline in the region due to a scarcity of tuna and sardines in Algarve's waters because they were the main raw materials used by the industry. Similarly to what happened to the declining Algarvean cork industry in the 1930s, many companies folded and others moved to Northern Portugal in the process. However, successful fish canning industry persists with a number of factories like those of Conserveira do Sul and others. Coincidentally, with this decline in fish canning in the region, since the 1960s the Algarve has embraced tourism which has become its most important economic activity. Faro International Airport located 4 km from downtown Faro, the administrative center of the region of the Algarve in Portugal, was constructed during the 1960s and inaugurated in 1965. In 2025, the airport reached a record-breaking of more than 10 million passengers handled a year.

With the increase in life quality and purchasing power of the Algarve's population, many shopping malls have been constructed since the 1990s and 2000s. An Ikea, the first in the Algarve, opened in Loulé, at the time one of the only five in Portugal. In 2017, the Algarve was the Portuguese region that experienced the biggest economic growth, an increase of 4.6% of its GDP.

With potential for solar power generation, the Algarve is becoming an international hotspot for large solar farming projects. The largest such project in Portugal and one of the largest unsubsidised solar power plants in Europe at the time, was inaugurated in Alcoutim in 2021.

Due to its all-year mild weather, beaches, cities, sites, landscapes and accommodation, as well as its public safety record and cost-effective prices, the region became in the 21st century one of the most attractive areas for filming, chosen by both low budget Indie film productions and large players in the film industry from Portugal and abroad.

=== Development ===
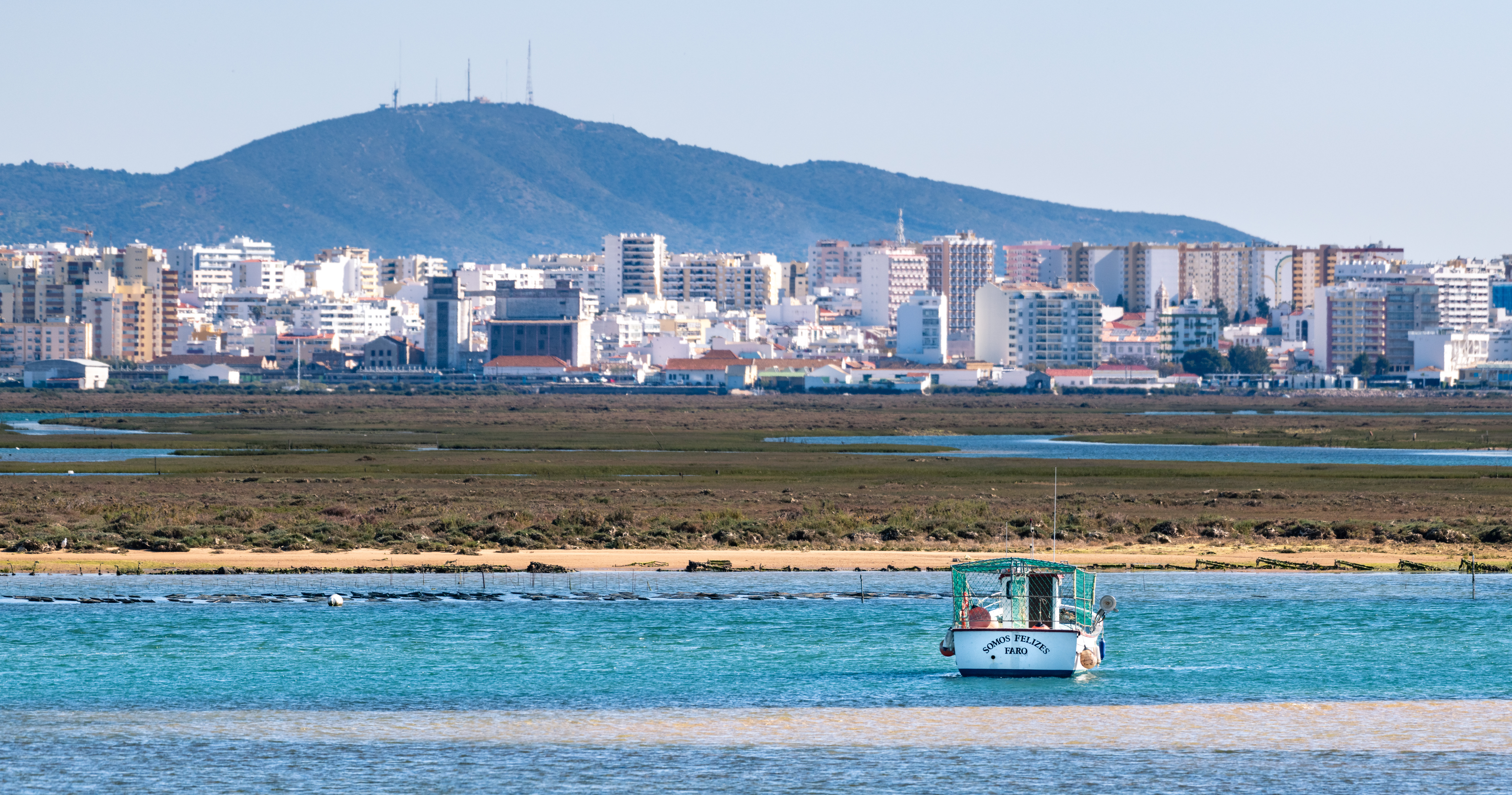
A panoramic view of Faro, the capital of the Algarve

The Algarve has been experiencing a strong development since the beginning of the 1960s, initially due to the need to accommodate its foreign visitors. The region started the construction of an airport in the early 1960s, followed by better infrastructure of other types, mainly roads, sanitation, power grids, telecommunications, hospitals, and housing. Private investors, with the support of the region's municipalities, also began the construction of a variety of hotels, resorts, golf courses (which are considered to be some of the best in Europe), and villas.

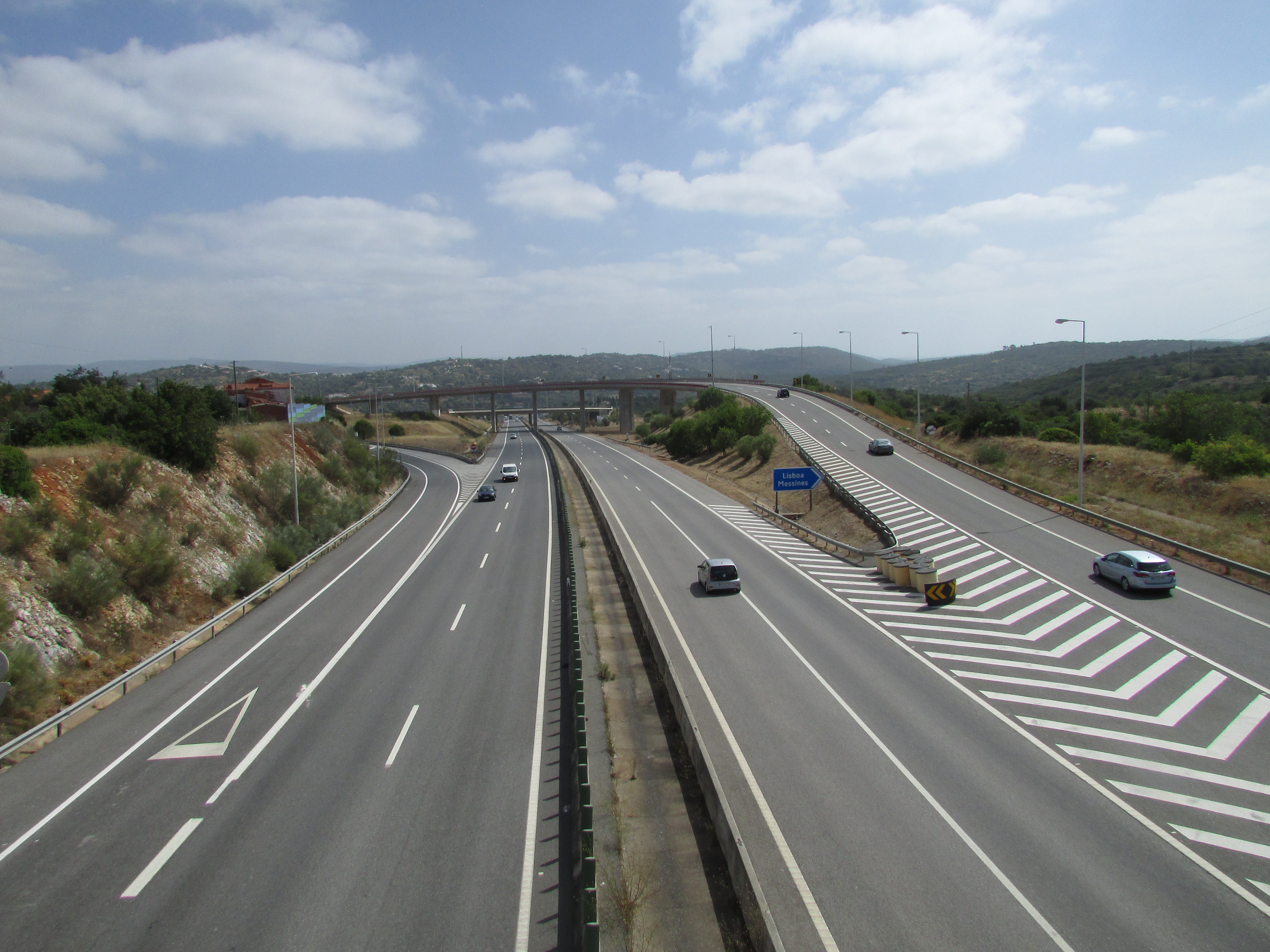
A22 motorway near Albufeira, Algarve, Portugal

All this led to a large development in the region, especially for the locals, who had previously lived in harsher circumstances. Today, the Algarve is amongst the regions in Portugal with the best quality of life. Due to the austerity measures introduced in 2011, tolls were placed on the main motorway that crosses the region (the A22 motorway which is also officially known as "Via do lnfante") to offset the expense of its maintenance. The University of Algarve, a state-run university founded in 1979, has been an important source of innovation and entrepreneurship for the whole region and plays a role as a major driving force of economic growth and development in the Algarve.

=== Tourism and attractiveness for expats ===
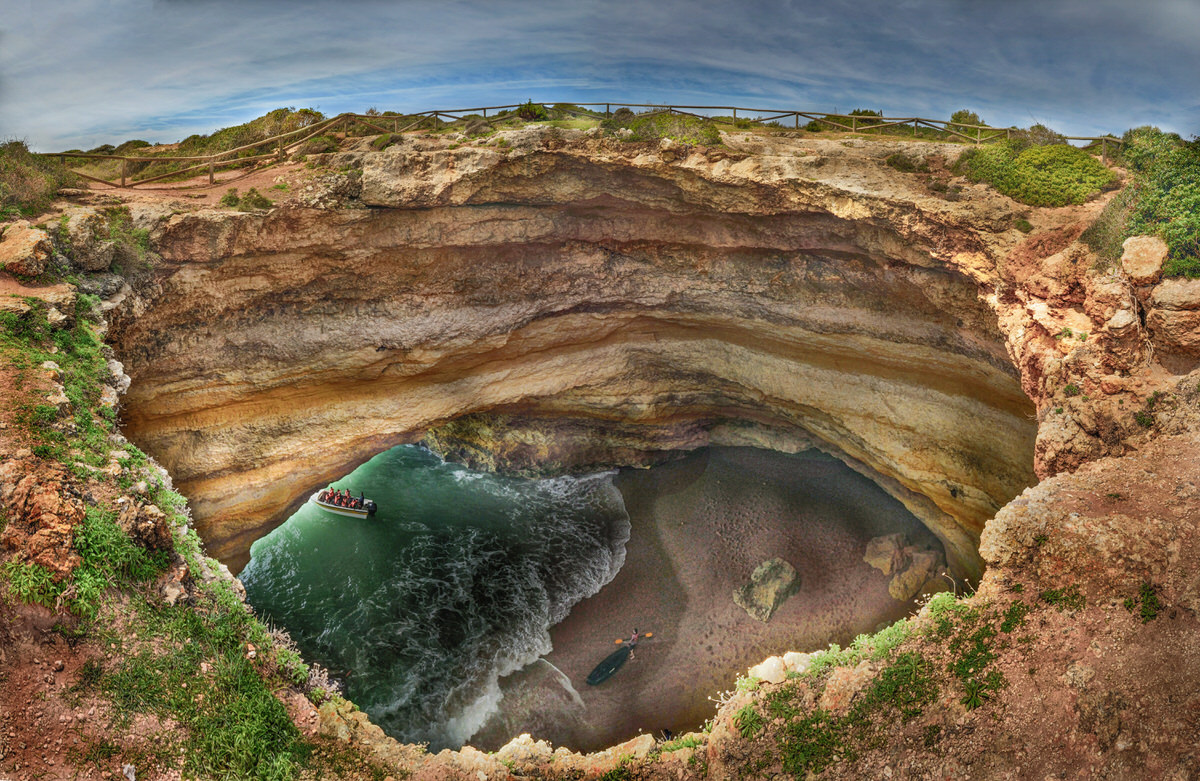
The Benagil Cave (or Algar) and Marinha Beach, near Lagoa, have become two of the most visited tourist attractions in the entire Algarve region.

In the 1960s, the Algarve became a popular destination for tourists, mainly from the United Kingdom which still is the origin of the largest group of foreigners in the Algarve. It has since become a common destination for people from Spain, France, Germany, the Netherlands, Ireland, Belgium, Switzerland, Italy, and the US not only as tourists who visit the Algarve but also as residing expats who settle in the region and buy property there. The Algarve's mild climate and hours of sunshine per year have attracted interest from Portuguese and other European people wishing to have a holiday home or residence in the region. Being a region of Portugal, and therefore in the European Union, any EU citizen has the right to freely buy property and reside with little formality in the Algarve. Algarve-based publications and newspapers are written in English specifically for this community.

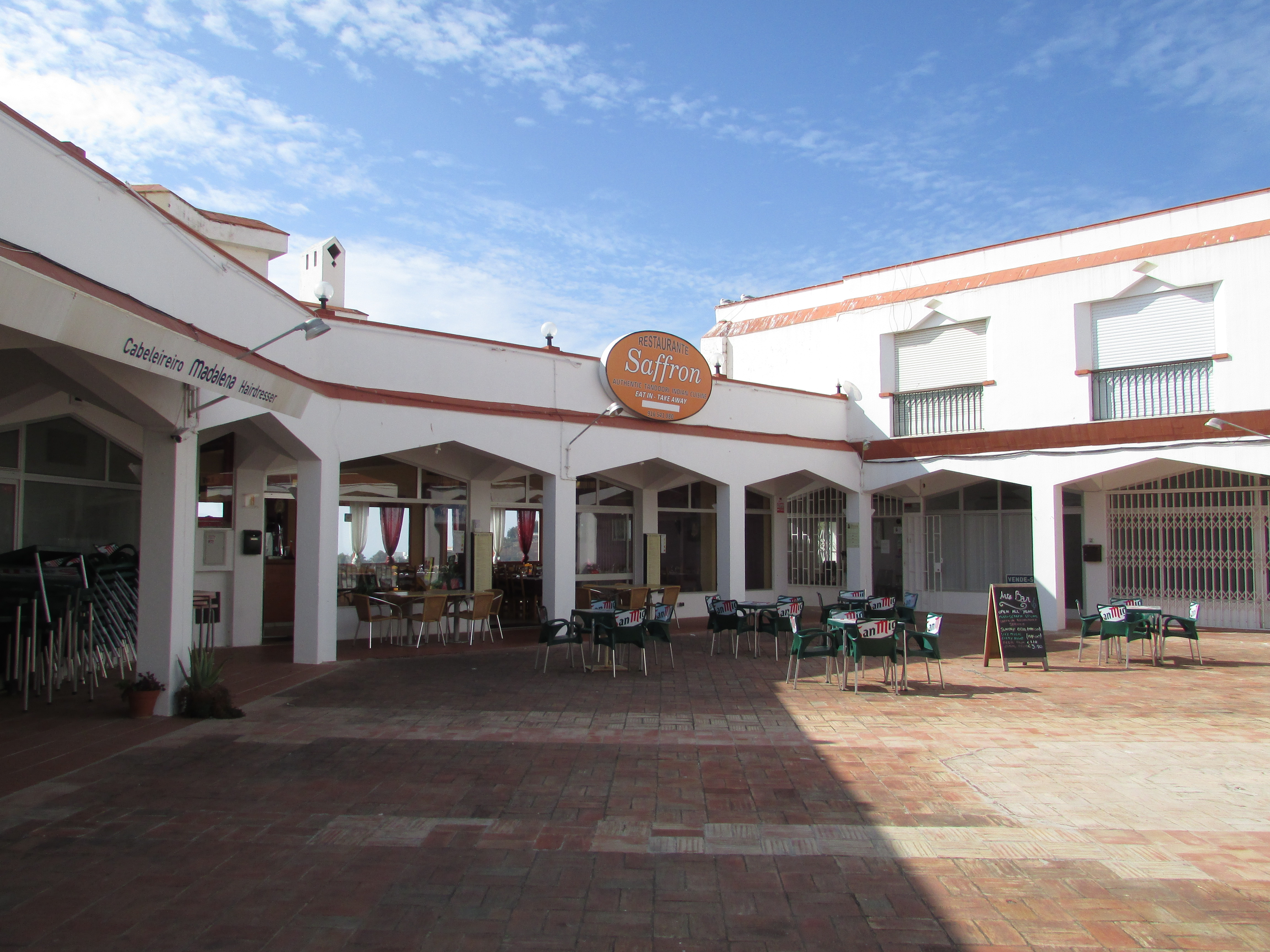
The Saffron Indian restaurant in the shopping arcade located in the neighborhood of Cerro Grande, Albufeira, Algarve, Portugal

The Brazilian community in the Algarve is the second largest expat community in the region after the British, followed by important numbers of Ukrainian, Romanian, Moldovan, Indian, Nepalese, Sinhalese, Bangladeshi and Pakistani people who arrived there to work in retail, hospitality industry, construction, agriculture and manufacturing. In the late 2010s, the Algarve saw a high increase in Canadian, American and Australian tourists too. In the Algarve, the expatriate population from high income economies include a large number of pensioners, namely from countries like the UK, Ireland, Germany, France, Netherlands, Sweden and the US. Portuguese people from other parts of the country also visit the region in large numbers, especially in the peak of the summer (July and August) and a sizable number of Portuguese citizens residing in other Portuguese regions, including retired people, own a holiday home in the Algarve. Several international studies have concluded that the Algarve is among the world's best places to retire.

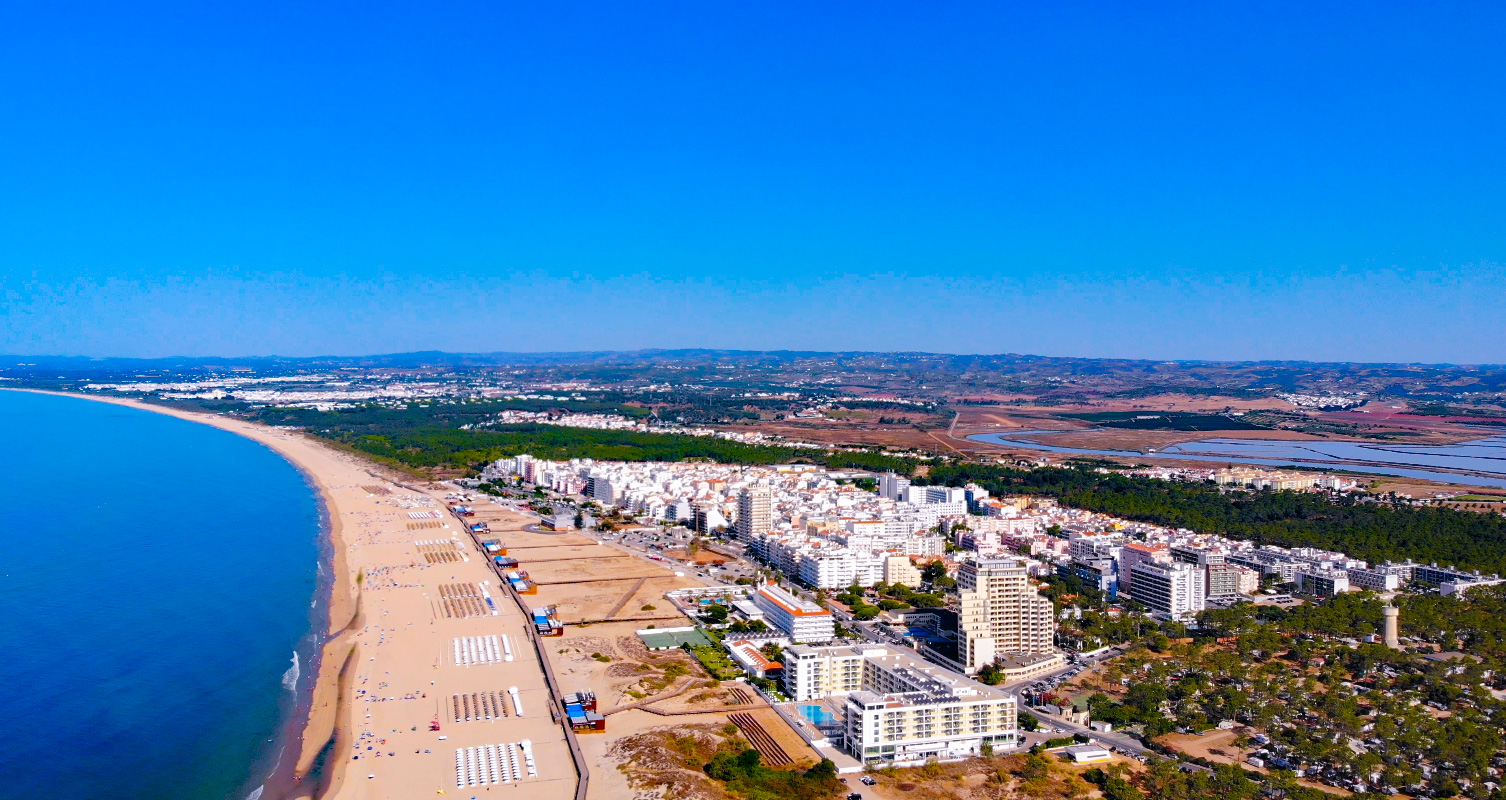
Aerial view of Monte Gordo, in the Algarve, Portugal

Tourist attractions in the region include its beaches, Mediterranean climate, safety, cuisine, and relatively low prices. The Algarve region has garnered international acclaim, winning the World's Leading Beach Destination title twice, in 2020 and 2021, and being named Europe's Leading Beach Destination nine times between 2012 and 2022, as recognized by the World Travel Awards™. Well-known beaches in the Algarve include Praia da Luz, Praia da Rocha, Marinha Beach, Armação de Pêra, Praia dos Pescadores, Quarteira, Vale do Lobo, Fuzeta, Barril Beach, Manta Rota and Monte Gordo. A well-known spa town is Caldas de Monchique. In addition to its natural features and beaches, the Algarve has invested in the creation of a network of golf courses. The Algarve is also popular for religious tourism, notably pilgrimages to the Sanctuary of Our Lady of Piety (best known as the Sovereign Mother), a Marian shrine dedicated to the patron saint of Loulé, that attract thousands of pilgrims of the Catholic faith to the city, or minor pilgrimages of faithful Catholics to the site of putative apparitions of Our Lady Mother of Goodness which had supposedly occurred in 1999 near the village of São Marcos da Serra.

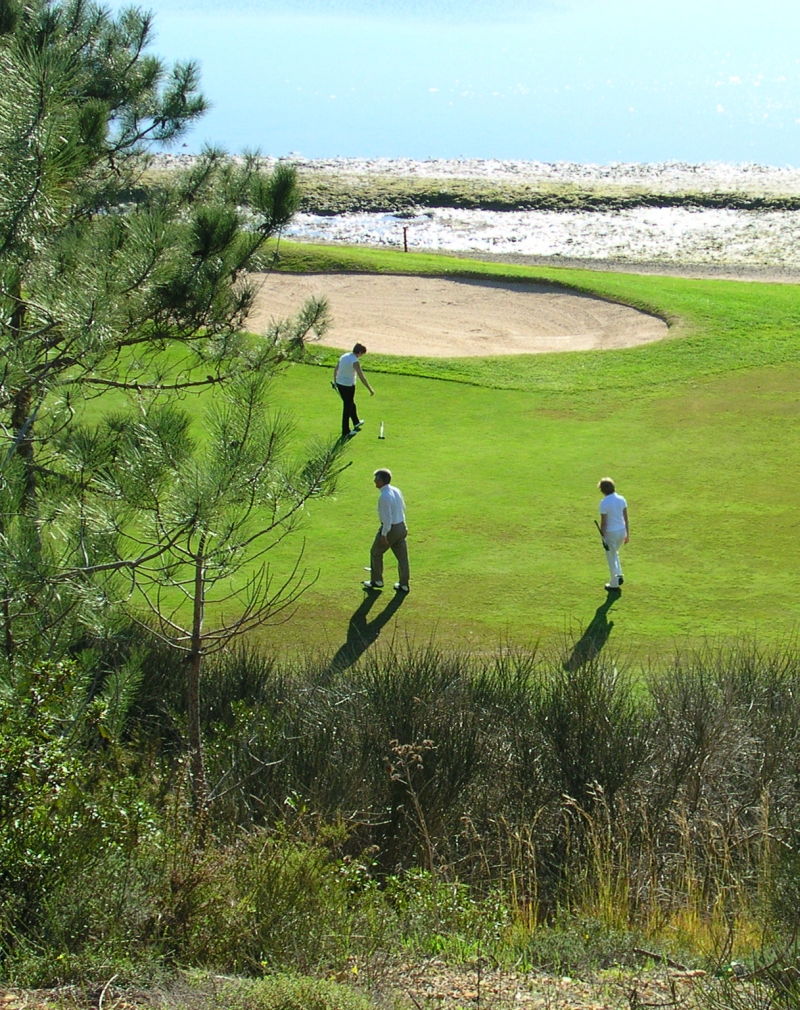
The Algarve features some of Europe's top golf courses.

Tourism plays an important role in the economy of the Algarve. A large number of seasonal job opportunities are tourism-related and are fulfilled by thousands of locals and immigrants. Due to its seasonal nature, most of the economy relies on the good weather available mostly for only about 5–6 months (characterized by a prolonged lack of rain and temperatures above 25 °C throughout the day), meaning that many Algarvians go unemployed during the low season. Nonetheless, due to the very high monetary income that the high season brings, most people in the Algarve are still able to have comfortable lives even while unemployed. Delivery of superior touristic services and products in a convenient and engaging way, also known as luxury tourism, is also found in several areas across the Algarve. The Golden Triangle, a first among such affluent areas, is located outside of Faro, capital of the Algarve, being known for its luxury resorts and Michelin star restaurants. According to World Travel Awards, the Algarve was Europe's leading golf destination in 2013 and 2014. Over 25 top-class courses are located in Algarve, most of which were designed by legendary names such as Nick Faldo, Seve Ballesteros, Jack Nicklaus, and Christy O'Connor Jr. In 2018, the region's income from tourism was over a billion euros; the number of visitors totaled 4.2 million. Tourism contributed €1.08 billion to the economy in that year.

==== Accommodation ====
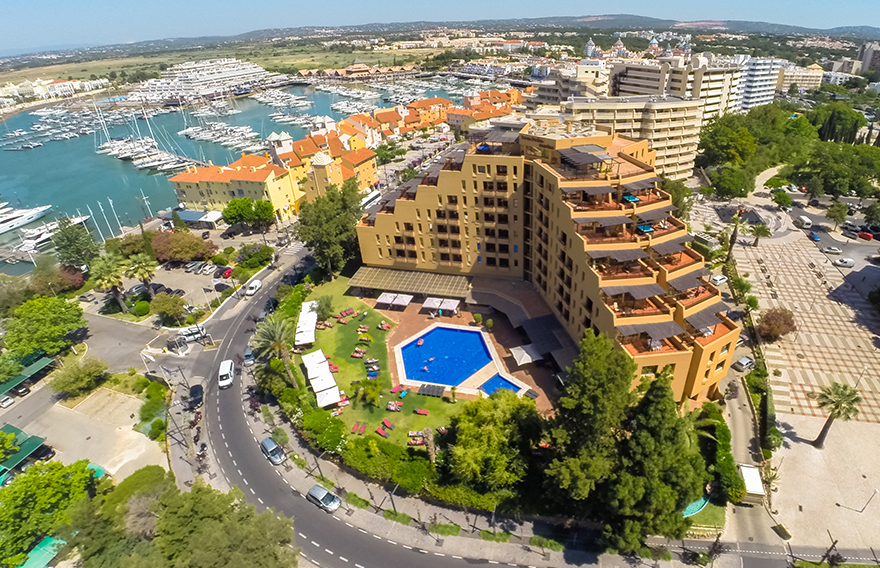
A view of Vilamoura, its marina and hotels

Accommodation in the Algarve ranges from high-rise resorts in places such as Albufeira, Vilamoura, Praia da Rocha and Armação de Pêra to apartment rental, bed and breakfast, hostels and traditional guesthouses located in small towns and villages, both inland and alongside the Algarve coast. Over the years, tourists with less acquisitive power started to visit the Algarve in large numbers and steering away from expensive resorts, opting instead for more affordable touristic establishments such as vacation rentals, guesthouses, and hostels. Besides affordability, a higher flexibility in rules and conditions, good overall location, as well as a greater hospitality and interaction with guests, are often cited as some of the appealing factors of these accommodations. Throughout the Algarve, local accommodation, as its colloquially known, employs over 20 thousand people in more than 32 thousand legal establishments and generates an estimated 980 million Euros yearly. The vast majority of tourists who seek this type of accommodation are British, Portuguese and French, but an exponential increase in tourists from Germany, Spain, the Benelux and Brazil has also been seen.

Camping, motorhoming and caravaning are also options for travelers and tourists in general across the Algarve. Both free and paid motorhome areas, suitable car parks and camping parks can be found around the entire region to this end. However, the Portuguese police forces may regularly patrol the areas where these activities are forbidden and can fine transgressors.

==== Criticism ====
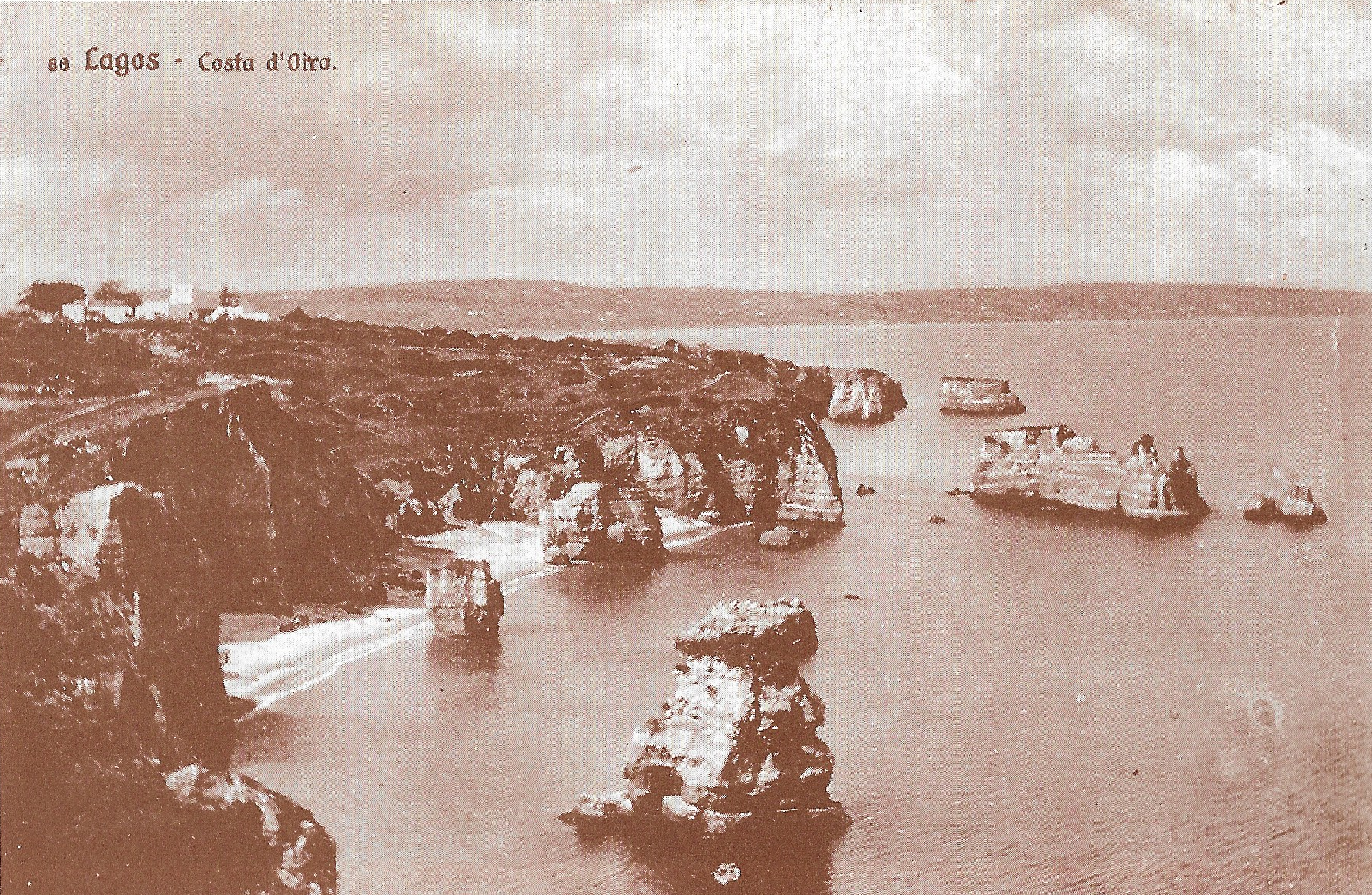
Postcard of the early 20th century with a photograph of the Costa de Oiro (Golden Coast) near the city of Lagos, Algarve, in southern Portugal. In the center is the Dona Ana Beach, and the building on the left is the Convento da Trindade (Trinitarian Convent).

Although international tourism and a generally high receptivity to globalism, economic globalization and foreign direct investment have brought a relatively high level of prosperity and development to the region, many personalities criticize the environmental impacts, the high cost of living and the eradication of the Algarve's cultural and traditional characteristics that such outside influence has brought. Algarve native Fernando Silva Grade (1955–2019), a nationally renowned plastic artist and activist with a licentiate degree in biology awarded by the University of Lisbon in 1983, in his 2014 book O Algarve Tal como o Destruímos (loose translation: The Algarve as we destroyed it), vehemently opposed the proliferation of the mass tourism and construction sectors, which, in his opinion, eroded large portions of a world unique coastline, degraded and destroyed Algarve's traditional architecture, along with the peaceful and slow-paced way of life that were once ubiquitous throughout the region. He further went on to criticize the inapt attitudes of politicians and city halls which continuously fail to preserve this legacy.

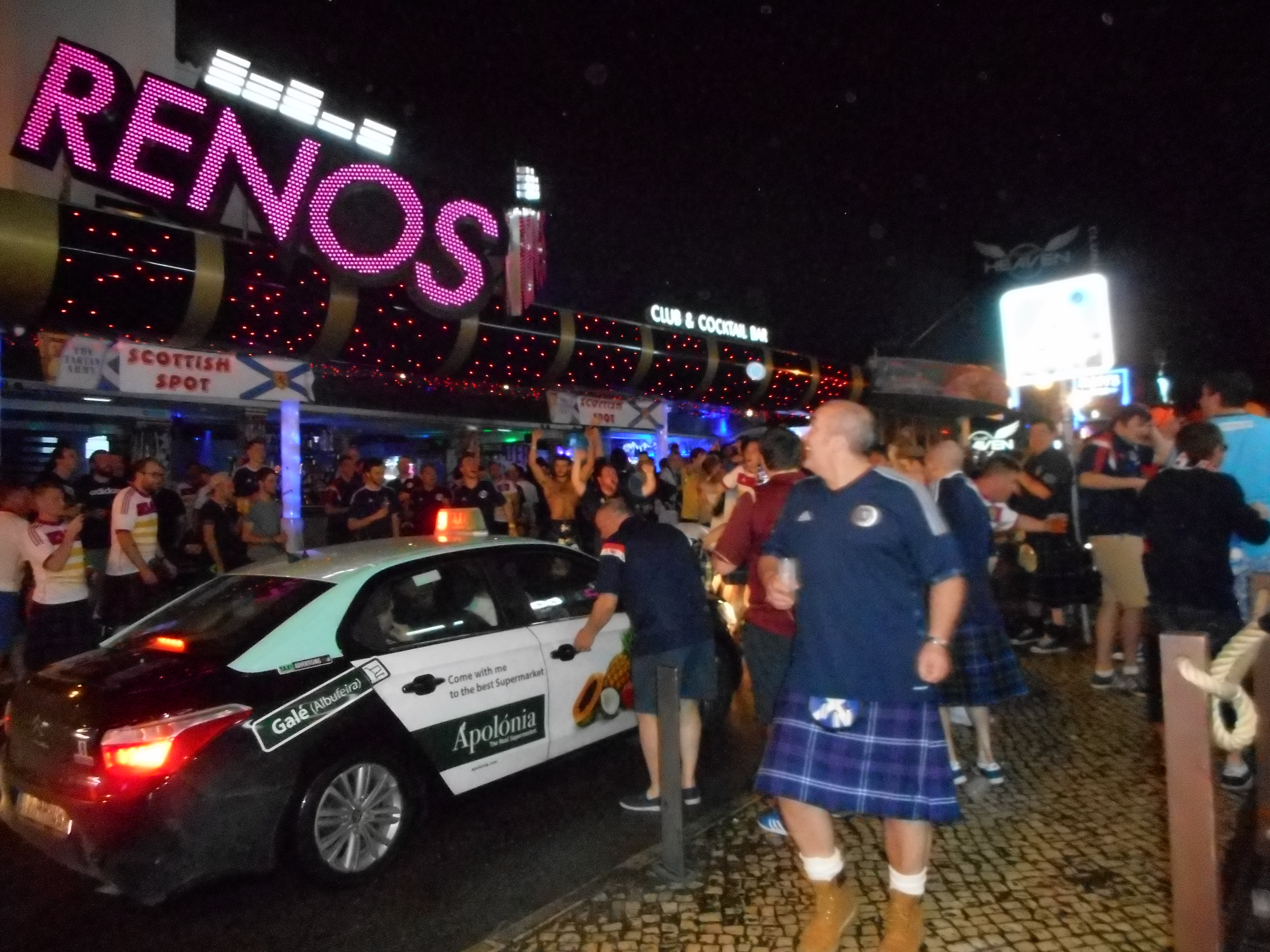
Scotland fans dancing on Francisco Sá Carneiro Avenue (The Strip) in Albufeira after the Gibraltar vs. Scotland UEFA Euro 2016 qualifying game played at Estádio Algarve

Other critics underline the over-dependency of the Algarve on tourism and the "sun and beach" modality of tourism in particular, the one mostly advertised by local and national authorities and, thus, most widespread. They accentuate the saturation of beach-side resorts that leave other types of tourist establishments, such as the ones dedicated to nature and health, with little occupancy. These critics also stress that overcrowdedness, filthiness and pollution are the consequences of this lack of diversity in the Algarve's tourism industry. In addition, due to international mass tourism, some areas of the Algarve are drug dealing and prostitution hotspots, including luxury prostitution and male prostitution, performed mostly by foreign sex workers.

The England-inspired, England-reliant tourist product of the Algarve since the 1960s is a source of criticism in Portugal to the point that the Algarve region has been compared to a colony of the English. Portuguese tourists perceive their status as tourists in the Portuguese region of Algarve as being constantly challenged by the extreme Anglophilia of the Algarvian people and its tourist offer.

== Culture ==
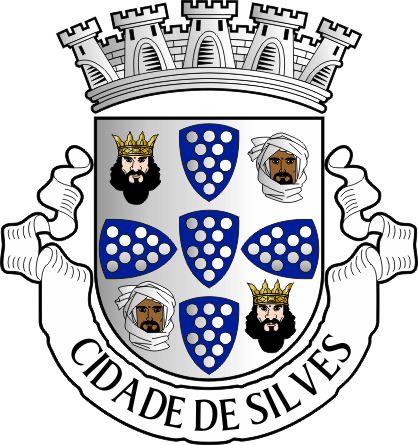
Silves Municipality coat of arms: Arab and Berber influences due to Islamic occupation of the territory of the Algarve between the 8th and the 13th centuries are seen in language, architecture, food, faces and even the Algarvean municipalities' coats of arms.

The region of the Algarve has a rich ethnographic heritage, with centuries-old customs, traditions and historical heritage. The Algarve is a cultural and historical point of interest all year round, but at particular times, such as Easter, Christmas, or even Spring, together with its gastronomic delicacies, the Algarve region has an old, multifaceted legacy that also shaped its regional cultural identity within Portugal. The Algarve is a place that gathers many settlements, from prehistoric times, to Phoenician, Roman, Visigothic, Arab and Christian Reconquista times, there are several testimonies that left a little piece of themselves, to form the Algarve of today. Since the menhirs and megalithic monuments like the Megalithic Monuments of Alcalar and the Menhirs of Lavajo that prove the presence of the first humans of its history, also the Romans left the testimonies of their presence and culture. The Roman Ruins of Milreu in Estói, the Roman ruins of Cerro da Vila in Vilamoura or the Roman ruins of Quinta da Abicada in Mexilhoeira Grande, are good examples of Roman vestiges in the Algarve, being some of them equipped with a dedicated interpretive center to tell their story. The Islamic occupation period from which a great heritage remains, present in various aspects of the Algarve culture beginning with the name of the region since the word "Algarve" goes back to the Arabic word "al-Gharb" meaning West (from Arabic: الغرب, romanized: al-gharb, lit. 'the west'), including castles and fortresses, vestiges of a unique ribat, the Ribat of Arrifana, as well as alcarias, and some churches that were adapted from ancient mosques, in addition to strong influences in popular architecture, also left its mark. Vila Real de Santo António, to the far east of the region, near Spain, is the best Algarve example of the strong legacy that the Marquis of Pombal left in Portuguese urban planning after the great earthquake of 1755.

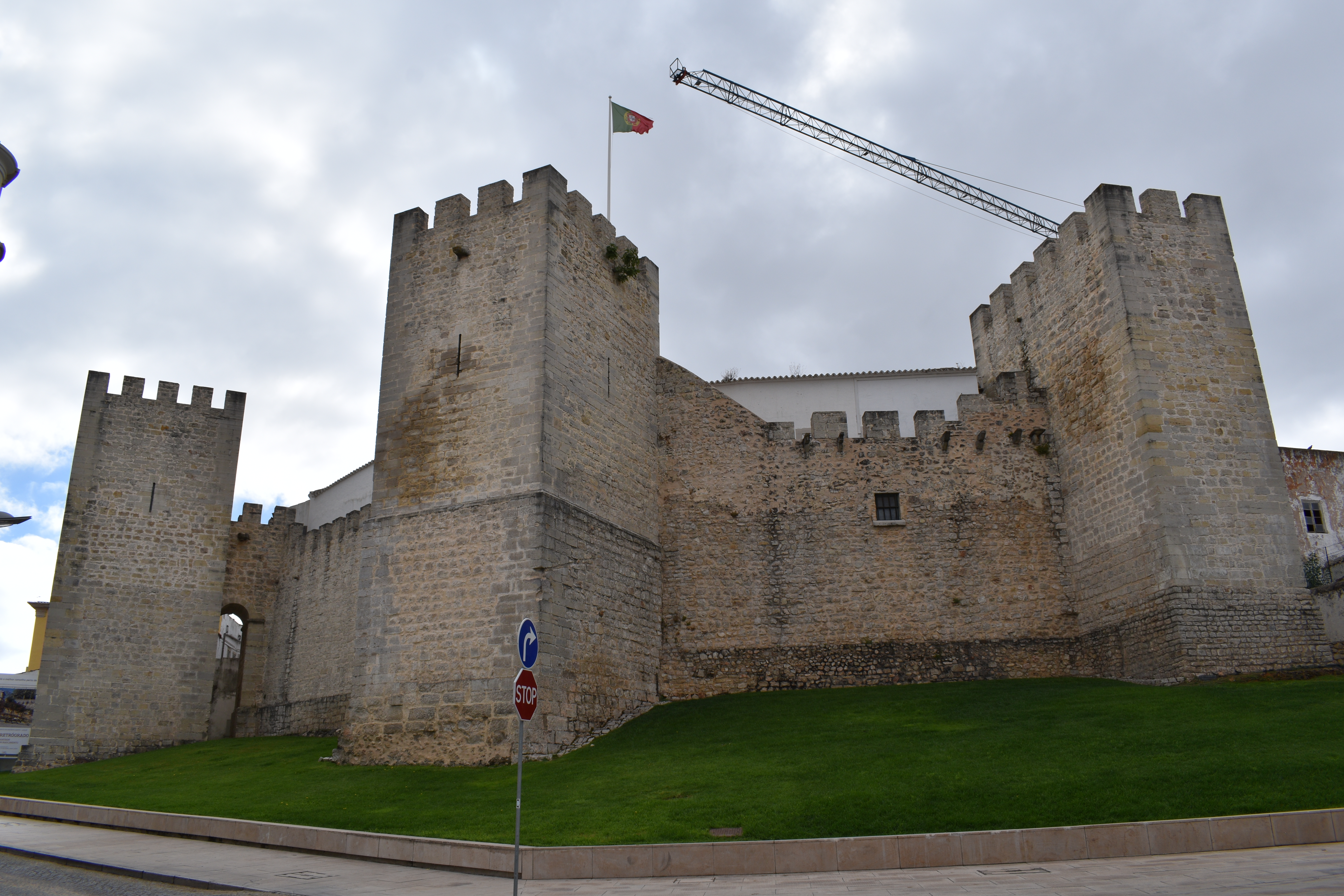
A view of the Castle of Loulé

The Algarve dialect is a dialect of Portuguese spoken in the Algarve. It is closely related to Alentejan Portuguese and expresses the region's peculiar way of life, its traditional sayings, as well as its well-known and highly colorful curses, idioms, proverbs, and expressions. It bears the influences of Arabic, archaic Portuguese and the southern variant of Castilian. Until the end of the 20th century it was ubiquitous but afterwards it became less common among younger generations who live near the coastal strip and the main urban centers. In any case, a majority of people in some places of the Algarve besides the sparsely populated, ageing hilly interior, like areas of Lagos, Portimão, Albufeira, Loulé, Faro, Olhão, Tavira and Vila Real de Santo António coastal municipalities, still speak the dialect employing its characteristic, strong accent on a daily basis.

Architecture in the Algarve

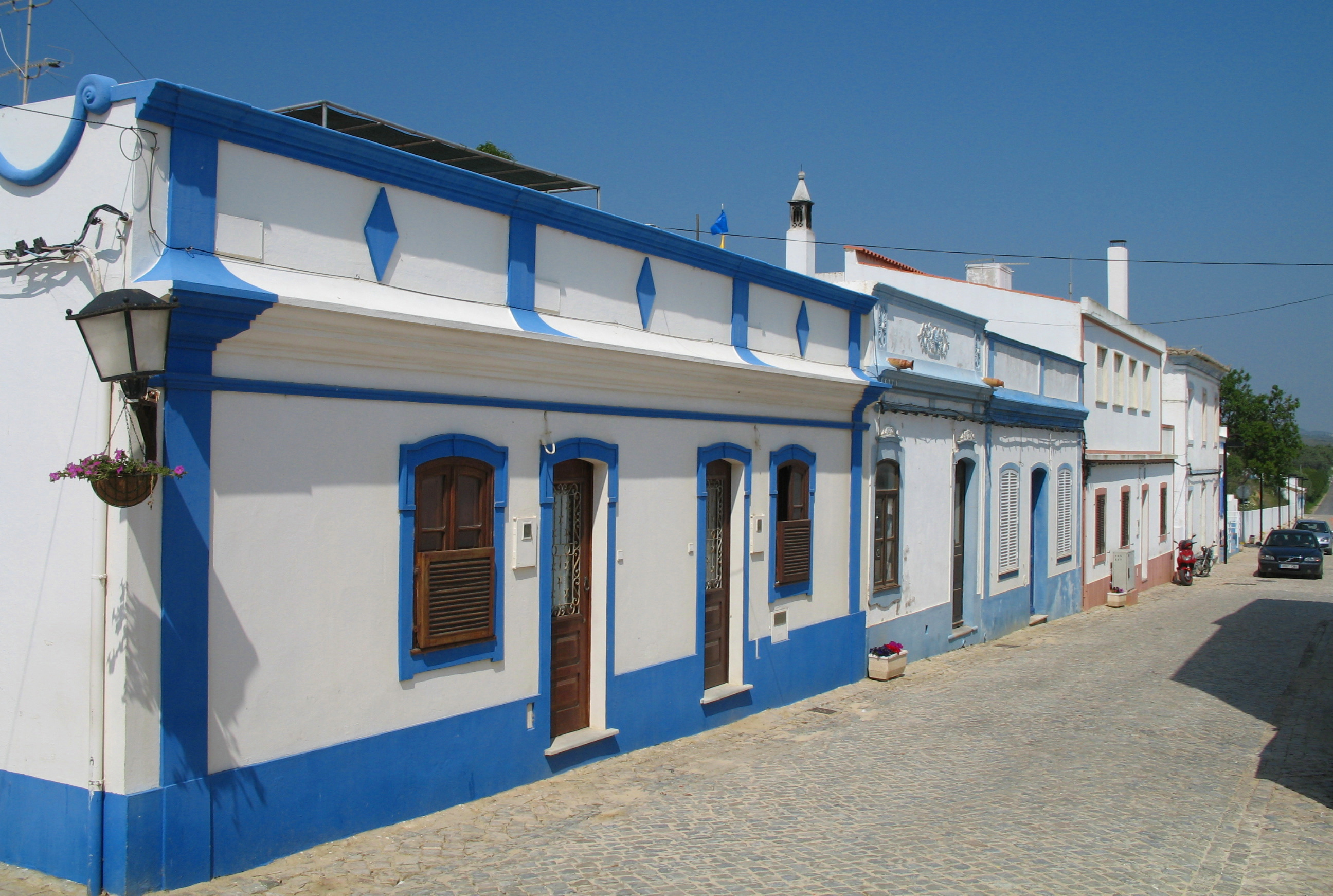
Traditional Algarve houses

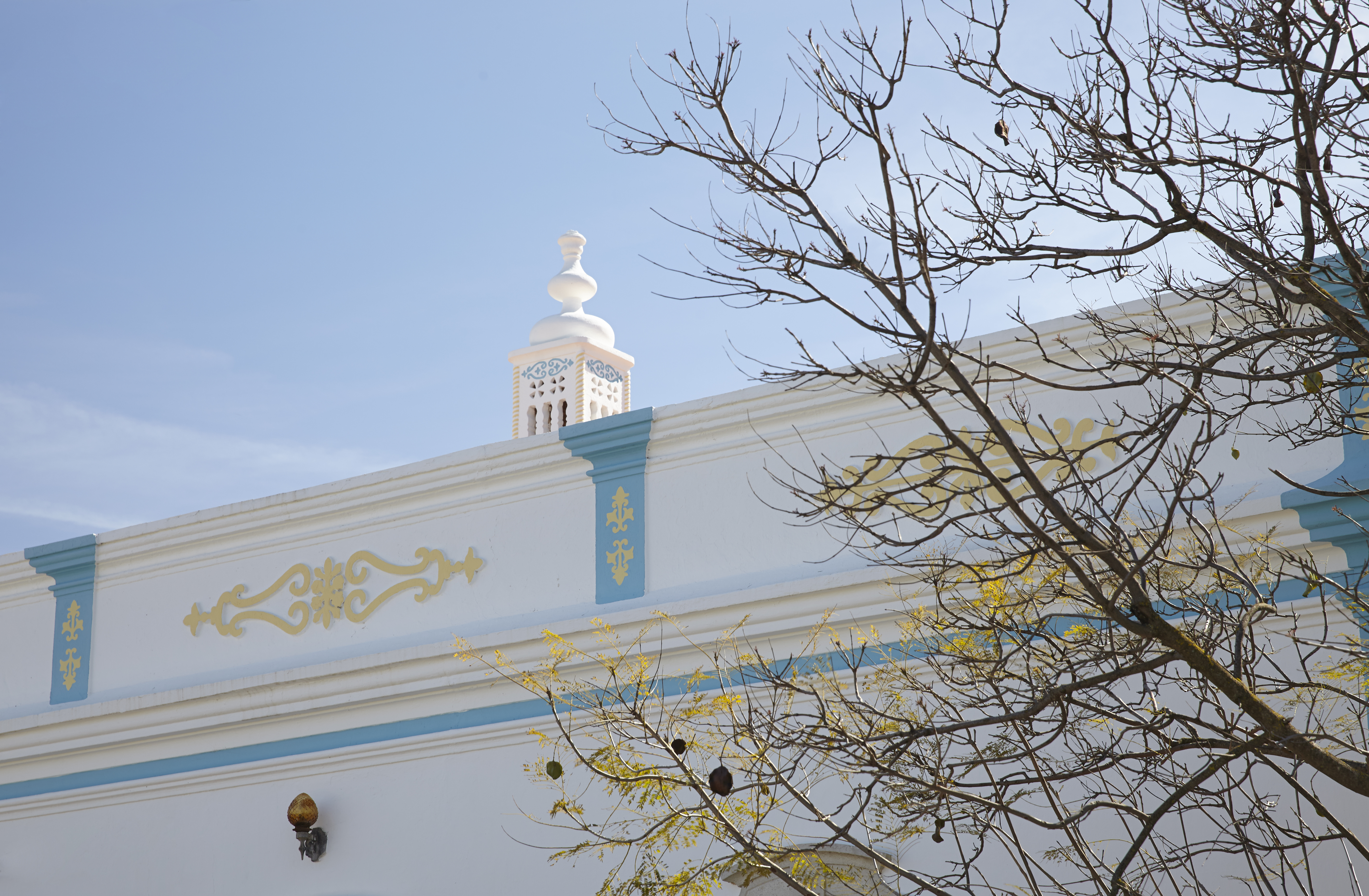
Ornate chimneys and platibandas are unique in their designs and first appeared in the 18th century.

The most striking symbol of the traditional Algarve architecture is undoubtedly the chimney, which reflected the individuality of the owner of the house and showed off his possessions. No two chimneys were alike, and the more intricate the design, the more expensive the work. Examples of these symbols of popular art and technical skill can be seen in the Algarve's rural hinterland, in the most affluent dwellings. The platibanda (platband) is another characteristic feature of the Algarve's architectural heritage. It is an elegant decorative strip that lines the facades and hides the roof or cladding, ornamented with geometric shapes and colors. It contrasts with the white of the whitewash and matches the colored bars that frame doors and windows. The four-sloped, or scissor truss are typical of aristocratic cities, and denote a strong Eastern aesthetic influence, which traveled along with silks and spices.

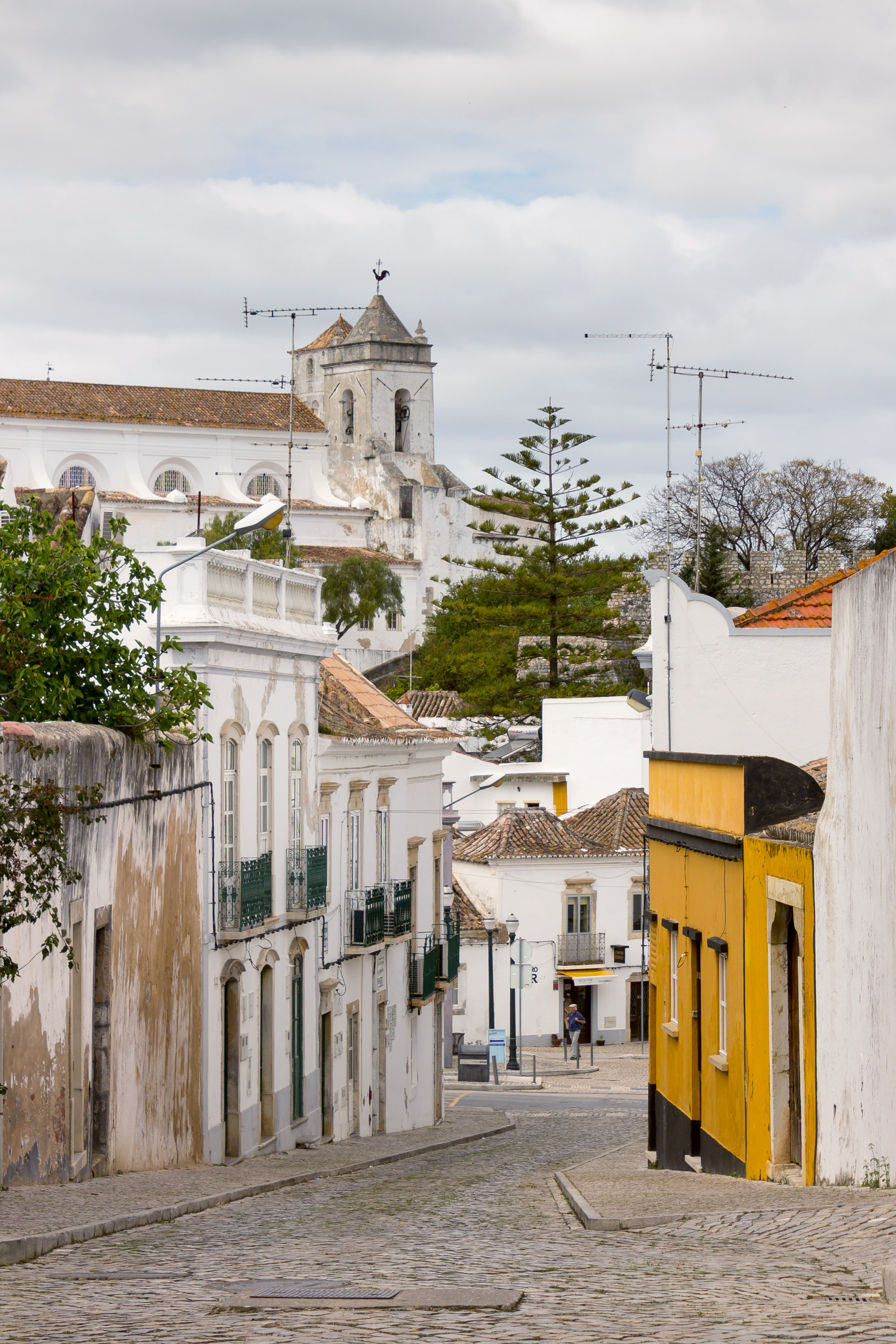
A central street in Tavira, Portugal

They are associated with Tavira, the princess of the Gilão, a well-preserved architectural gem and once a port of great strategic importance. They also exist in Faro, but their presence is residual today. In the western Algarve the winds blow from the Atlantic coast and, in its interior, there is the mountain climate. Here the houses are generally simpler, less sophisticated, built in masonry of mud or stone, and unadorned, only whitewashed. These simple rural houses are also found, in their charming simplicity, in the Caldeirão mountain range. On the coast, it is frequent the construction of açoteias, roof terraces of Arabic inspiration that were used to watch the sea, waiting for the boats returning from their fishing trips. It was also in these private spaces that fruit and fish were dried, and that people rested on hot summer nights. Olhão is the ex-libris of this architecture of pure and clean lines, deserving the nickname of cubist city, with its buildings clustered in cubes in a sinuous plan, direct influence of the architecture of Morocco.

Corridinho is the traditional dance of the Algarve bearing some resemblance to the polka and mazurka. The corridinho is a form of Portuguese folk dance whose the origin is unclear and believed older, although it gained popularity in the 1800s.

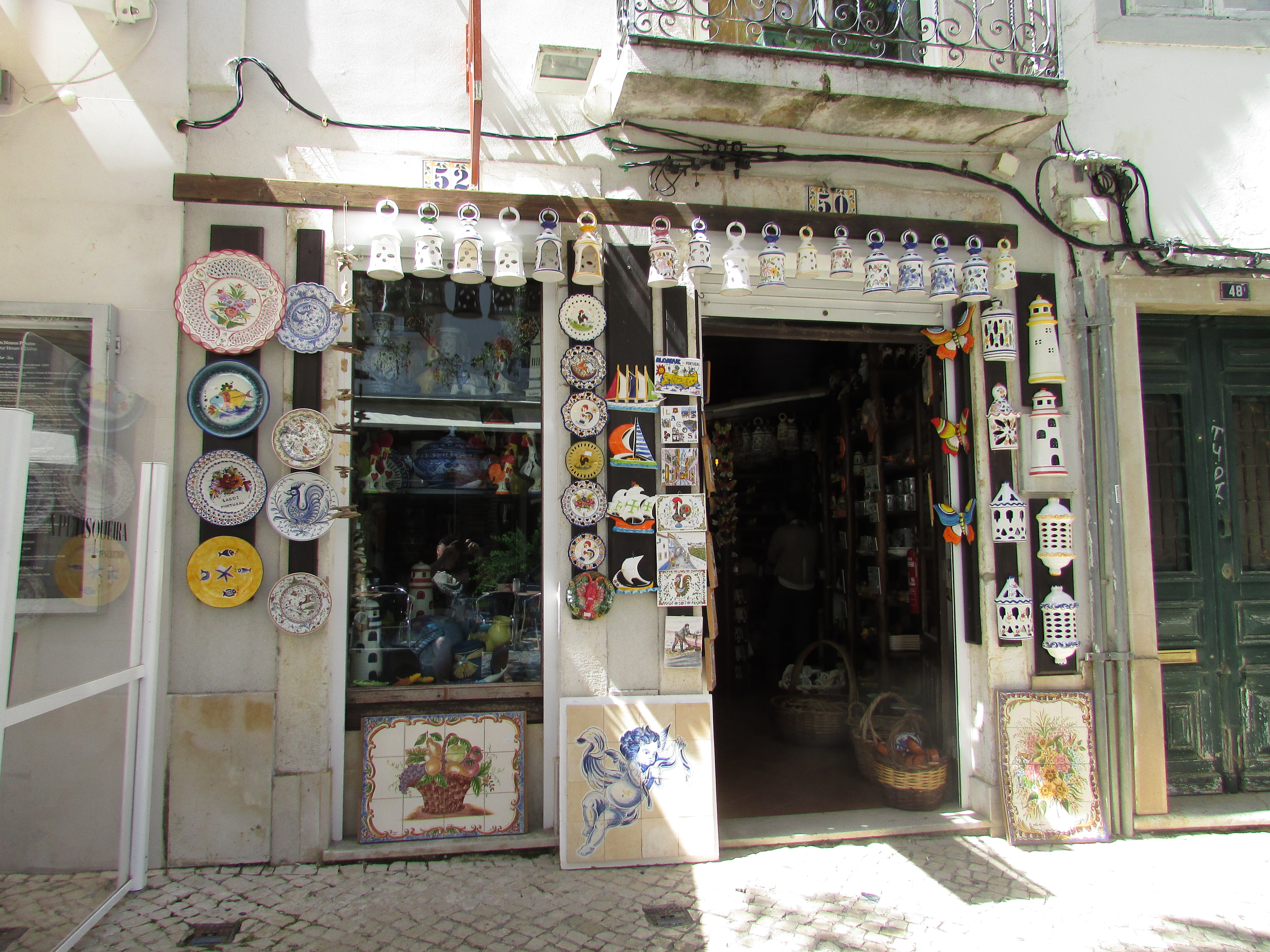
Algarve ceramic and pottery shop in Lagos

The Algarve is also famous for its pottery and ceramics, particularly hand-painted pottery and azulejos, which are painted, tin-glazed ceramic tiles. Numerous ceramics and pottery outlets are open throughout the Algarve, including a number of potteries established by foreign artists interested in the old tradition of Algarve pottery. For working potteries and ceramics workshops, the main (or best-known) pottery centers are located in Almancil, Loulé, Porches and Silves, but many other Algarve ceramic and pottery workshops and shops are found across the entire Algarve region. Other representative handicraft activities of the Algarve are the "empreita", a braid of fine palm leaf rolled up in the most diverse shapes, and the basketry, resulting from the technique of weaving the cane and the wicker, with such perfection that makes the Algarve basketry famous in the Portuguese south.

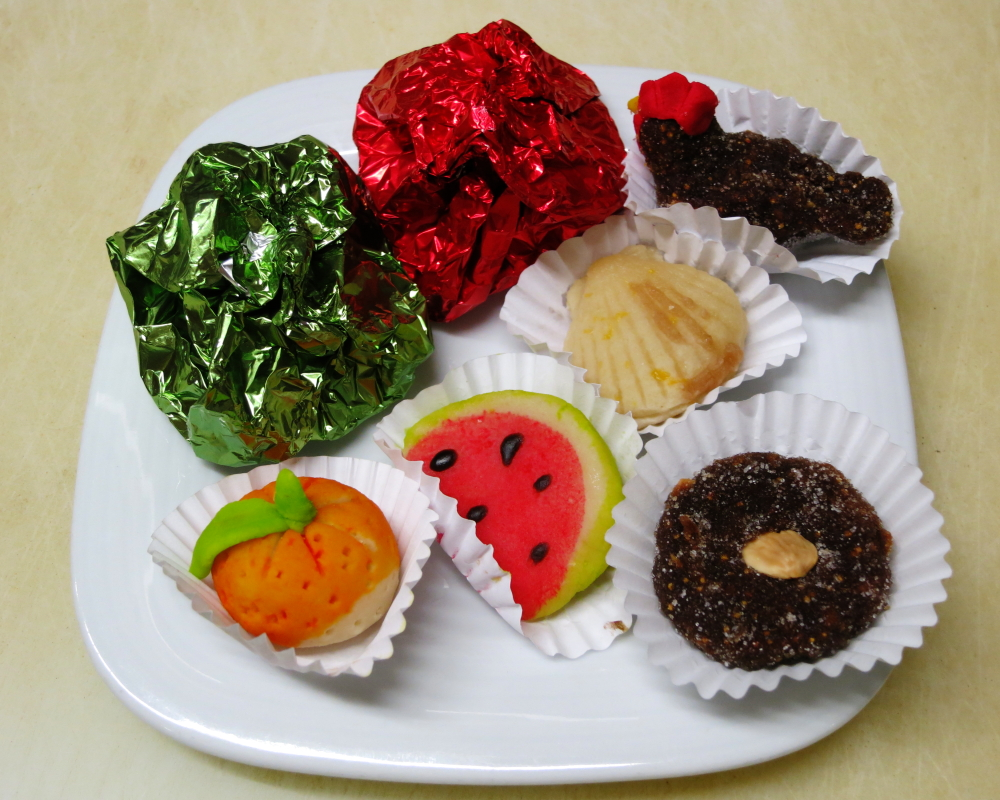
Typical sweets of the Algarve: Dom Rodrigos (presented in colorful aluminum foil wrapping), doces de amêndoa (marzipan sweets) and fig paste sweets (the two dark brown sweets on the plate)

The Algarve gastronomy dates back to the historical times of the Roman and Arabic presence, constituting, along with the climate of the region, one of the main points of tourist interest. The ingredients used reflect the fresh flavors of the sea and the pleasant and strong aromas of the countryside. From the "arroz de lingueirão" rice with razor clams from Faro, the grilled sardines from Portimão to the sweets "Dom Rodrigos" from Lagos, there are dishes and delicacies for all tastes. The town of Monchique stands out in this chapter because it is known for its pork production, proof of which are the well-known sausages made with pork meat (sausage, morcela black pudding, farinheira and chouriço) and presunto hams, exhibited annually at the Feira dos Enchidos and Feira do Presunto, respectively. The typical aguardente de medronho (arbutus berry brandy) produced in this region both artisanally and industrially, is also a very well known fruit brandy in the region. The liqueurs made with regional products are also sought after. Those include ginjinha (sour cherry liqueur) and amêndoa amarga (bitter almond liqueur).

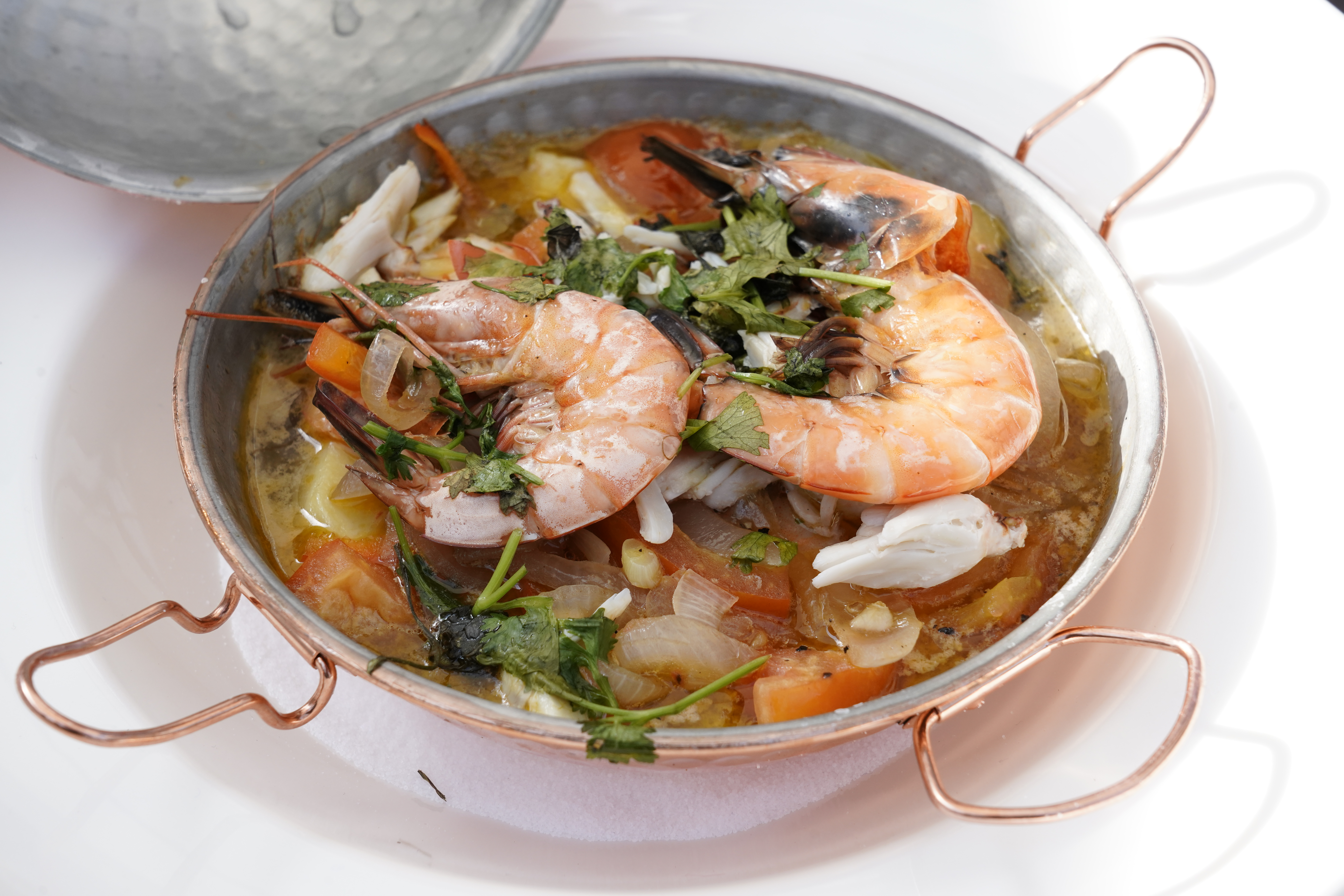
Seafood Cataplana at World Heritage Cuisine Summit & Food Festival 2018: The cataplana is a Portuguese method of cooking, an item of cookware used for cooking a wide variety of ingredients, and a typical dish from the Algarve.

Old fig and almond-based sweets and desserts as well as newer carob-based products; a plethora of fish and seafood dishes near the coast; and pork and chicken dishes from inland Algarve, are among the most typical elements of its regional cuisine. Cataplana; frango de churrasco like that known as frango de churrasco à la Guia; caldeirada; Portuguese tuna steak 'Algarve style'; a variety of seafood dishes which may contain various shellfish like clams, mussels, crab and shrimp; grilled sardines; Algarve style stuffed and fried squid; marzipan; and xarém are some of the typical regional culinary specialties in the Algarve. Carne de porco à alentejana, which is named after the neighboring region of Alentejo, is speculated by some to have its roots in the Algarve region because the clams are much more popular as food in seaside cities, towns and villages like those of the Algarve rather than in places far from the ocean. It may be an example of fusion cuisine between pork dishes of inner Alentejo where pig farming is extensive and seafood dishes of coastal Algarve where shellfish abound.

Although Loulé hosts the largest carnival in the Algarve, every town and village in the Algarve has its own party. It usually starts with a children's parade through the streets on the first day, where the little ones march, walk or dance in dresses and masks. People gather in the streets to cheer on the children. In most villages there are dances every night in the village halls. The dancing starts early and ends late, with no breaks in the local carnival music that entertains people of all ages. Cities and towns also organize street parties, with local dancers, some as young as 6 years old, dressed up in their national costumes, entertaining everyone with their traditional instruments and complicated dance steps. Others organize parades with music, fanfares, floats, and local groups dressed up in all kinds of costumes – from the simplest to the most elaborate. Everyone joins in clapping and stamping their feet, always celebrating and cheering. Candy and streamers are thrown towards the crowd that stretches along the streets, reminding them that this is a time for feasting and celebration

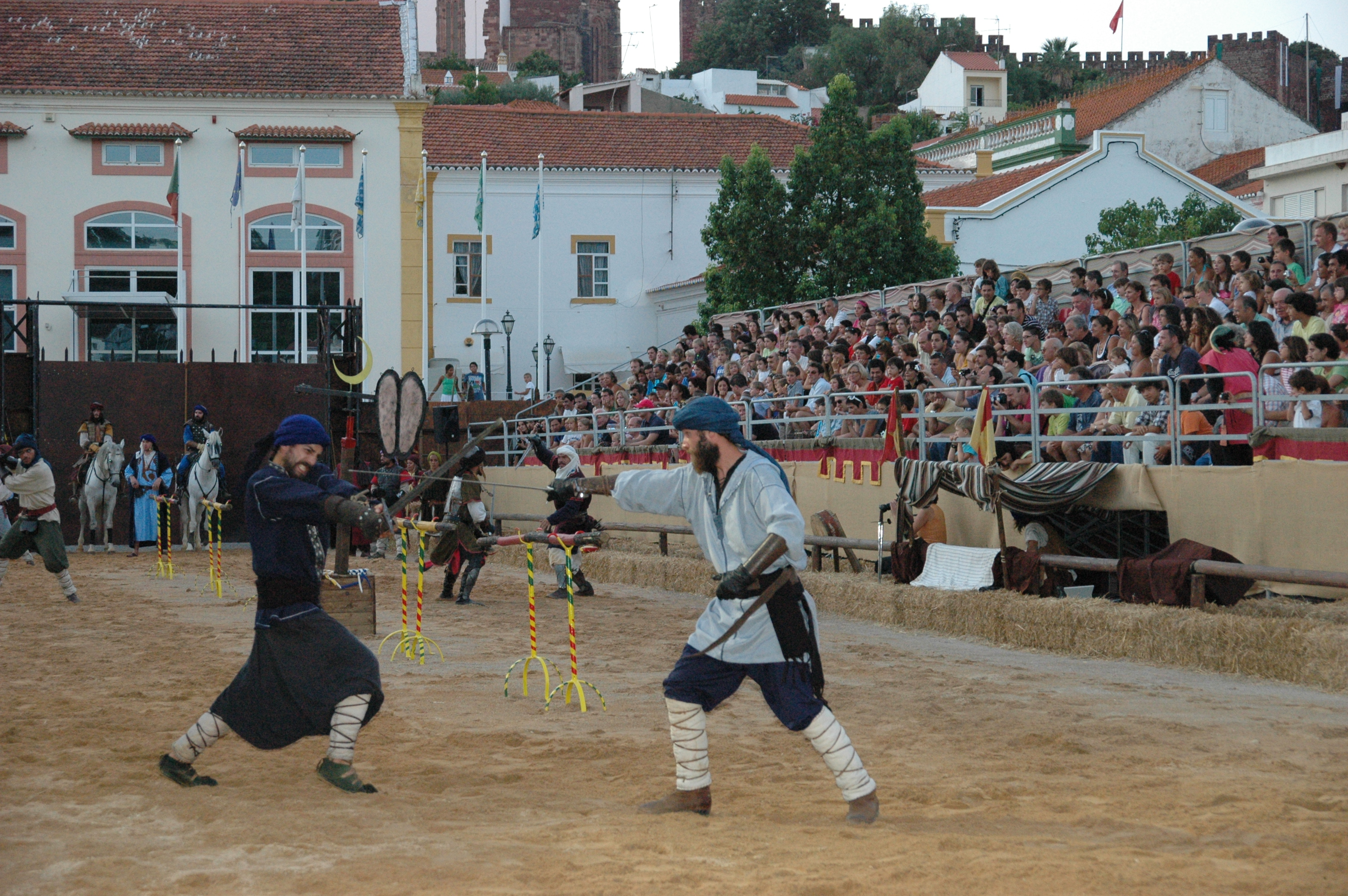
The medieval fair of Silves occurs every year in August and attracts an average of more than 100 thousand visitors.

In western Algarve, the Barlavento, in Odiáxere, there are 5 days of entertainment, parades and music. Lagos and Sagres also offer plenty of entertainment during the festivities. In the Central and Eastern Algarve, the Sotavento – besides the big event in Loulé – Quarteira, São Brás, Olhão, Moncarapacho, Tavira and Vila Real de Santo António all organize festivals and corsos in their own way. Although the festivities in the Algarve are now heavily based on the samba style of Brazilian Carnival, the old tradition of playing pranks is still present. Stylishly dressed student girls tour shopping malls, bars, cafes and the streets, singing their satirical songs about the government, politicians and world events.

Every year in August the city of Silves organizes a medieval fair which incorporates Muslim Algarve and Reconquista themes, celebrating the region's conjoint Muslim and Christian cultural heritage. The fair attracts an average of 100 - 150 thousand visitors during its 10-day run, and it is Algarve's most visited medieval fair.

== Fauna and flora ==
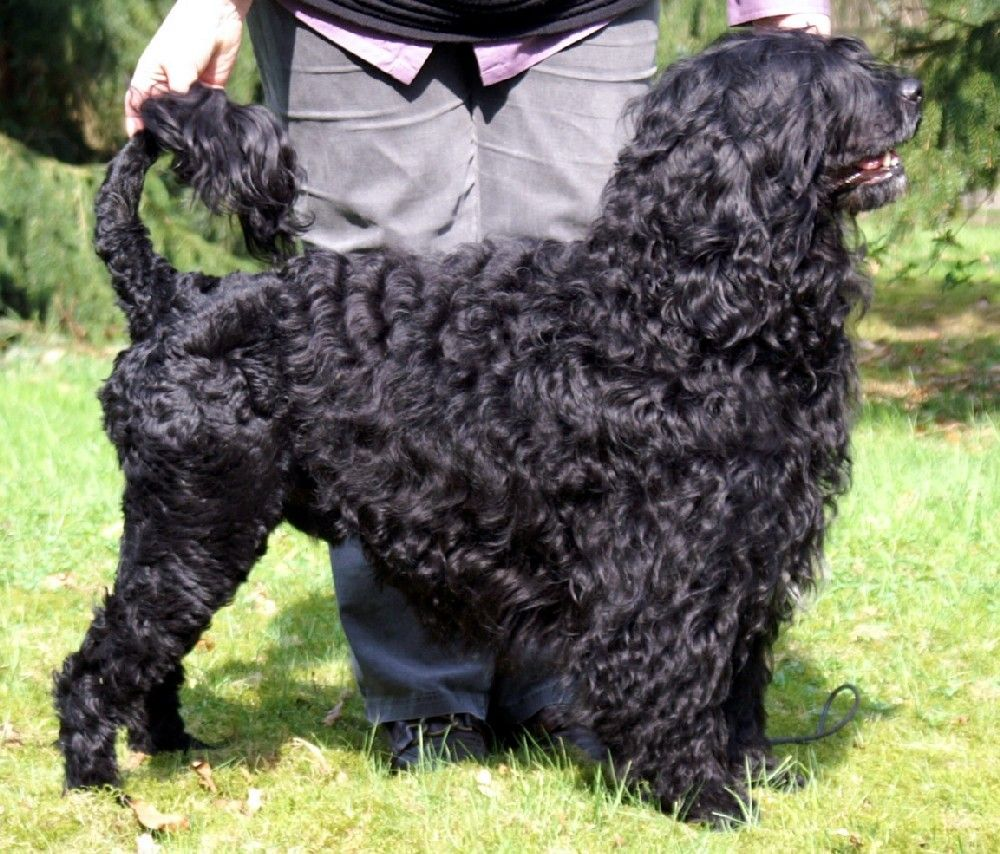
Portuguese Water Dogs are native to the Algarve; they were the fisherman's main companion and often accompanied sailors during the Portuguese discoveries.

The coastal seafaring people of the Algarve bred the Portuguese Water Dog. From there the breed expanded to all around Portugal's coast, where they were taught to herd fish into fishermen's nets, retrieve lost tackle or broken nets, and act as couriers from ship to ship, or ship to shore. This dog breed is now a distinctive dog breed of both Portugal and the Algarve region in particular.

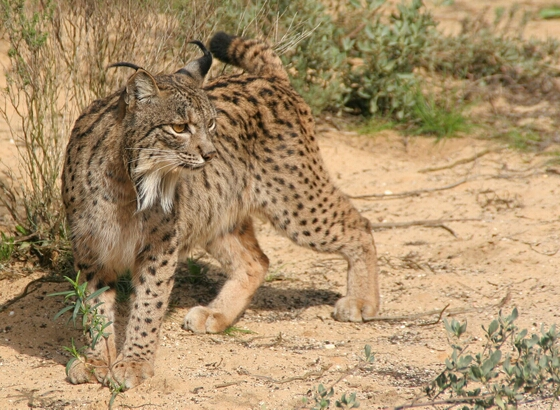
The Algarve once had the largest population of the Iberian lynx in Portugal. It was reintroduced in the 1st quarter of the 21st century.

A wild cat formerly at risk of extinction, the Iberian lynx (Lynx pardinus) used to populate five distinct areas in Portugal: the Algarve region, Serra da Malcata (Centro Region), Serra de São Mamede (Alentejo Region), Vale do Guadiana (the Portuguese section of Guadiana River) and Vale do Sado (Sado River). The southern strip of Portugal, the Algarve region, was the area with the greatest concentration, occupying an area of about 650 square kilometres between the Monchique, Caldeirão and Espinhaço de Cão mountain ranges. In the early 21st century there was a move to reintroduce them in Portugal by breeding them in captivity, from animals brought from Spain.

A paradise for bluefin tuna fishing, the Algarve in Portugal witness each year the migration of bluefin tuna that runs in front of the coasts of Olhão. The sea waters in this region are also populated by various whales, dolphins and porpoises at different times throughout the year. The most common species are the common dolphin (Delphinus delphis) and bottlenose dolphin (Tursiops truncatus). On the Ria Formosa Natural Park one can find unique species in Portugal and most of Europe such as the chameleon, a reptile that in Portugal only exists in the Algarve, and one of the largest populations of seahorses in the world.

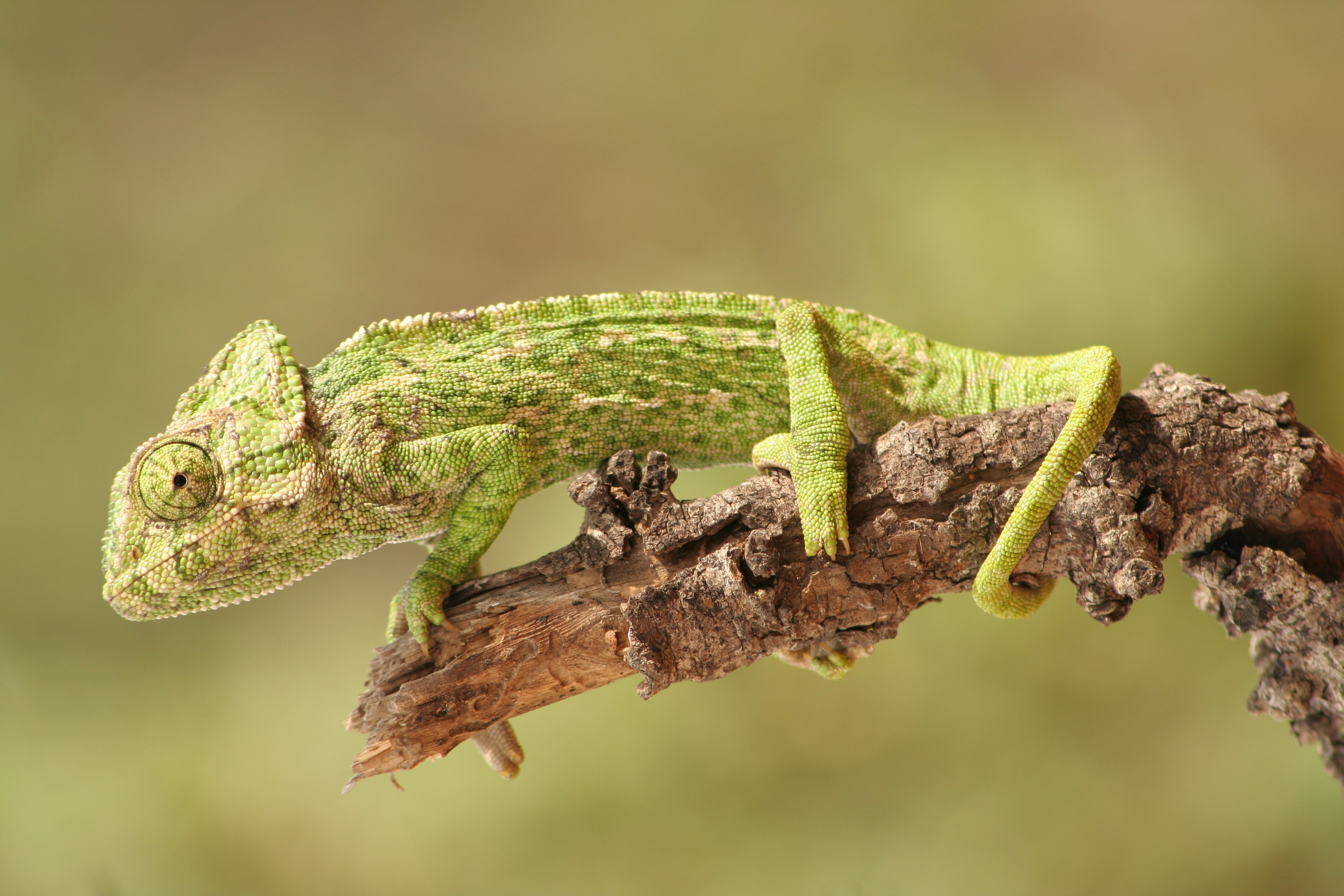
A Mediterranean chameleon

The Algarve is divided into three regions: the Litoral – the southern coast with its beaches; the Barrocal – the northern interior and the Serra de Monchique in the northwest and the Serra do Caldeirão in the northeast. The vegetation of the northern Algarve is divided into forests, hilly terrain, scrubland, fertile land and pastures with mountain springs and streams, lakes and waterfalls.

The south is dominated by the typical vegetation of Ria Formosa lagoon and dune system. Regarding flora in the south of Algarve, there are two main features: on one hand, the marshes – areas submerged by high tide and uncovered at low tide – with its halophytic vegetation (vegetation that tolerates high saline levels, lack of soil oxygen and long periods of emersion).

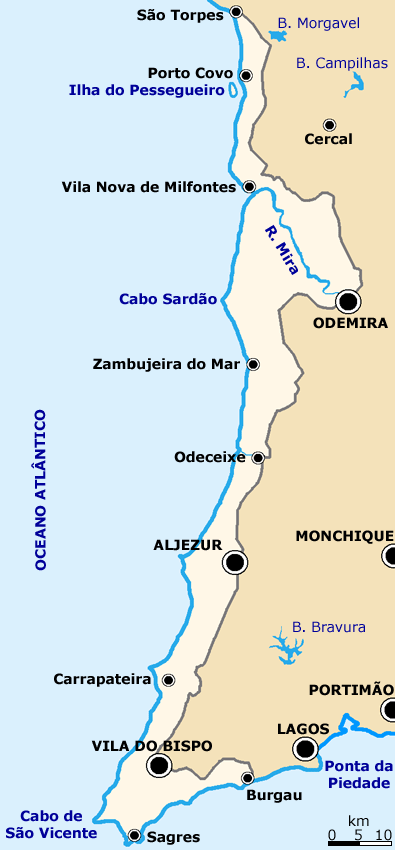
Map of the land area of the Southwest Alentejo and Vicentine Coast Natural Park in the southwest corner of Portugal The Portuguese natural park covers territory of coastal Algarve from Burgau to Odeceixe.

On the other hand, the dune flora – species adapted to strong winds, excessive salinity and high permeability of the soils – which presents species as the Ammophila arenaria, the Armeria maritima, the Aster tripolium, the Pancratium maritimum and the Otanthus maritimus. At the mouth of the Espiche River near Armação de Pera and Albufeira an area of wetland called the Salgados Lagoon fed by the waters of that river is found. The Salgados Lagoon has been classified as an IBA (Important Bird Area). Further west, near Alvor, one can find the Ria de Alvor (Alvor Estuary) located between the towns of Lagos and Portimão, covering 1,700 hectares with a mix of habitats of brushwood, forest and agricultural land, comprising the estuary, dunes, marshes and salt-pans. On the west and southwestern tip of coastal Algarve, there is the Southwest Alentejo and Vicentine Coast Natural Park, another natural park of the Algarve which extends further north along the Portuguese coast to the Alentejo region.

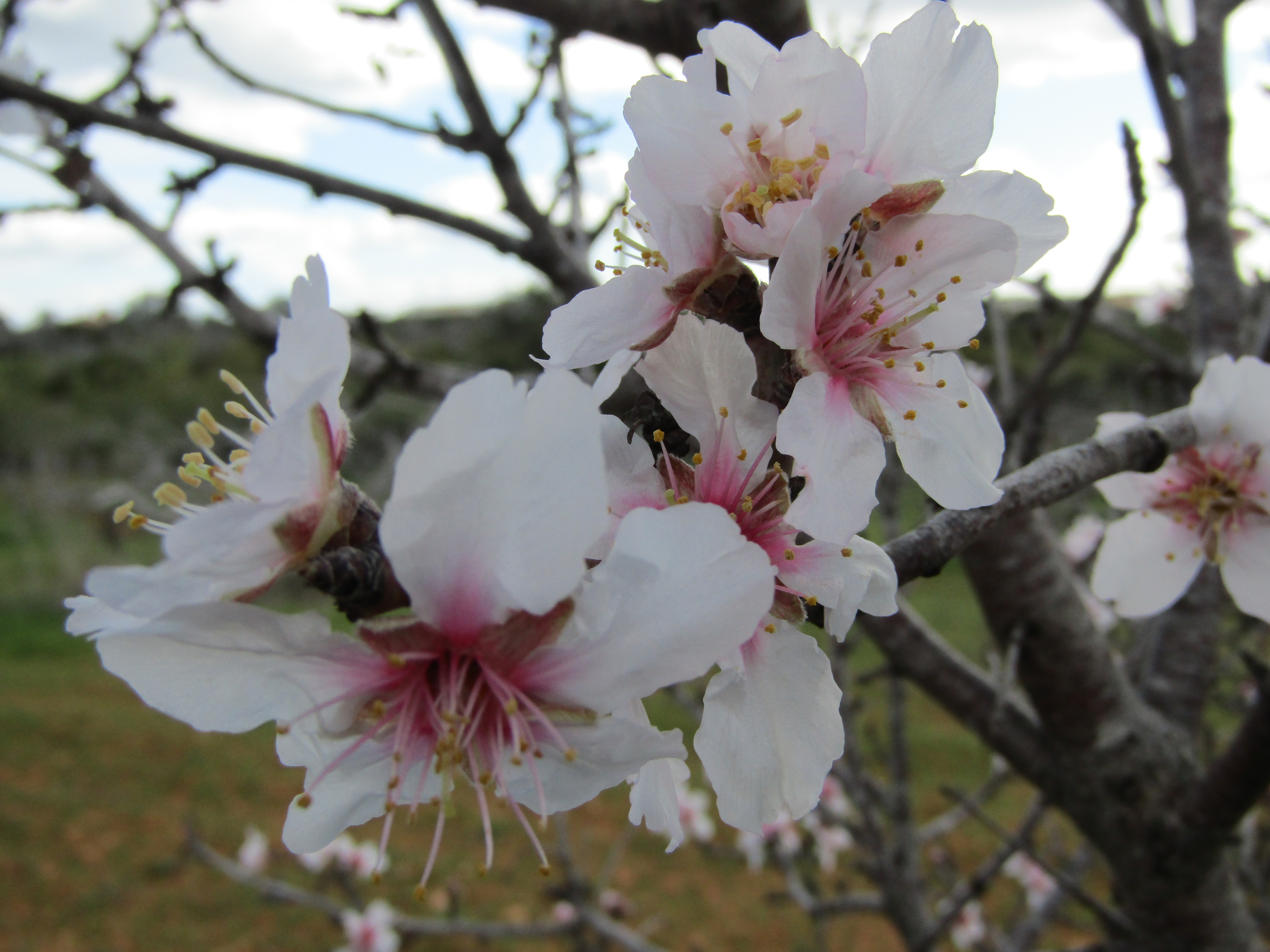
Almond blossom (Prunus dulcis) in Algarve, Portugal

Cultivars like the Prunus dulcis, Ficus carica and Citrus × sinensis are regarded as typical in the region and are widespread across the Algarve landscape but the most relevant wild tree and shrub species of Algarve include:

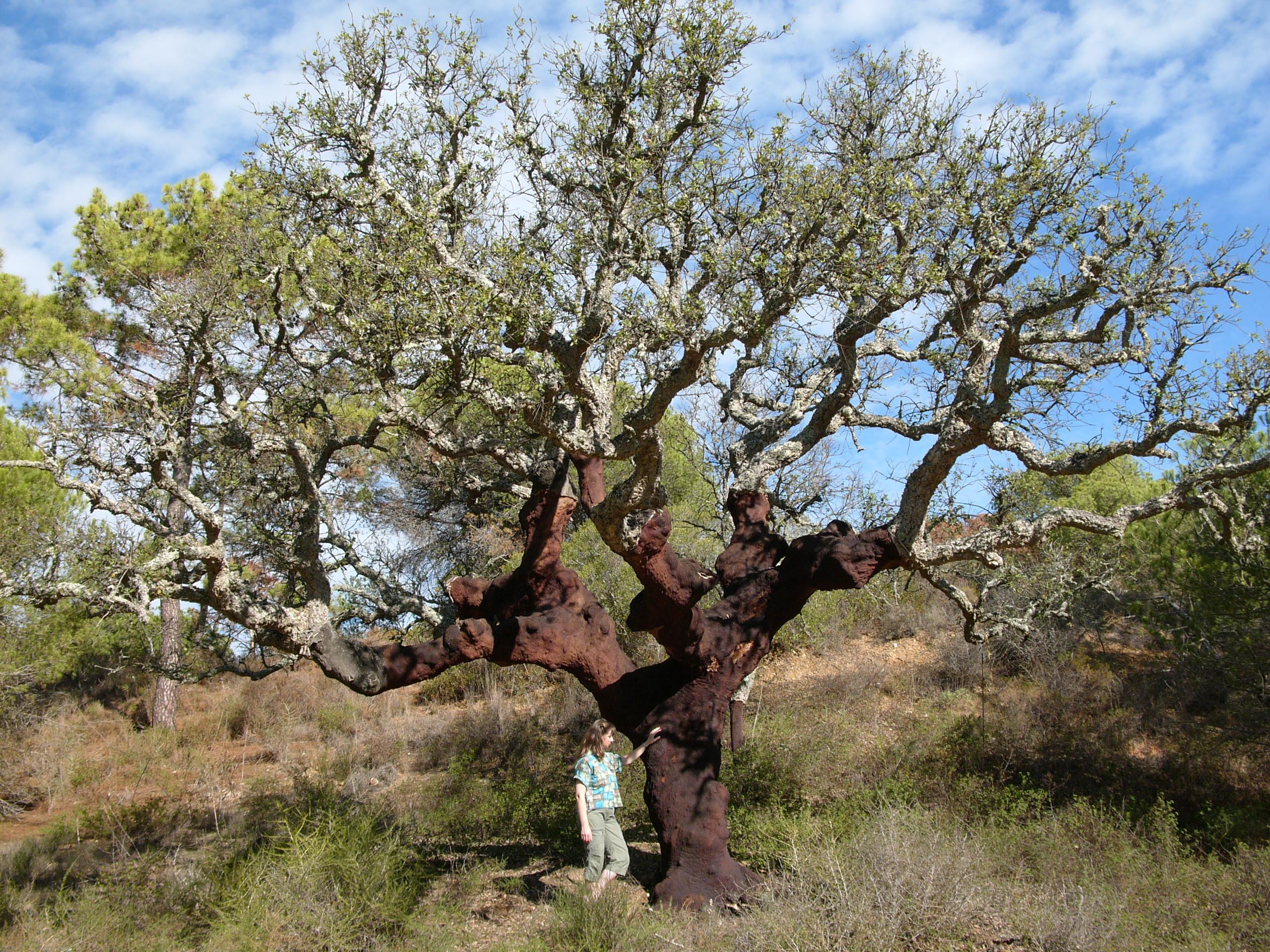
Quercus suber in Algarve

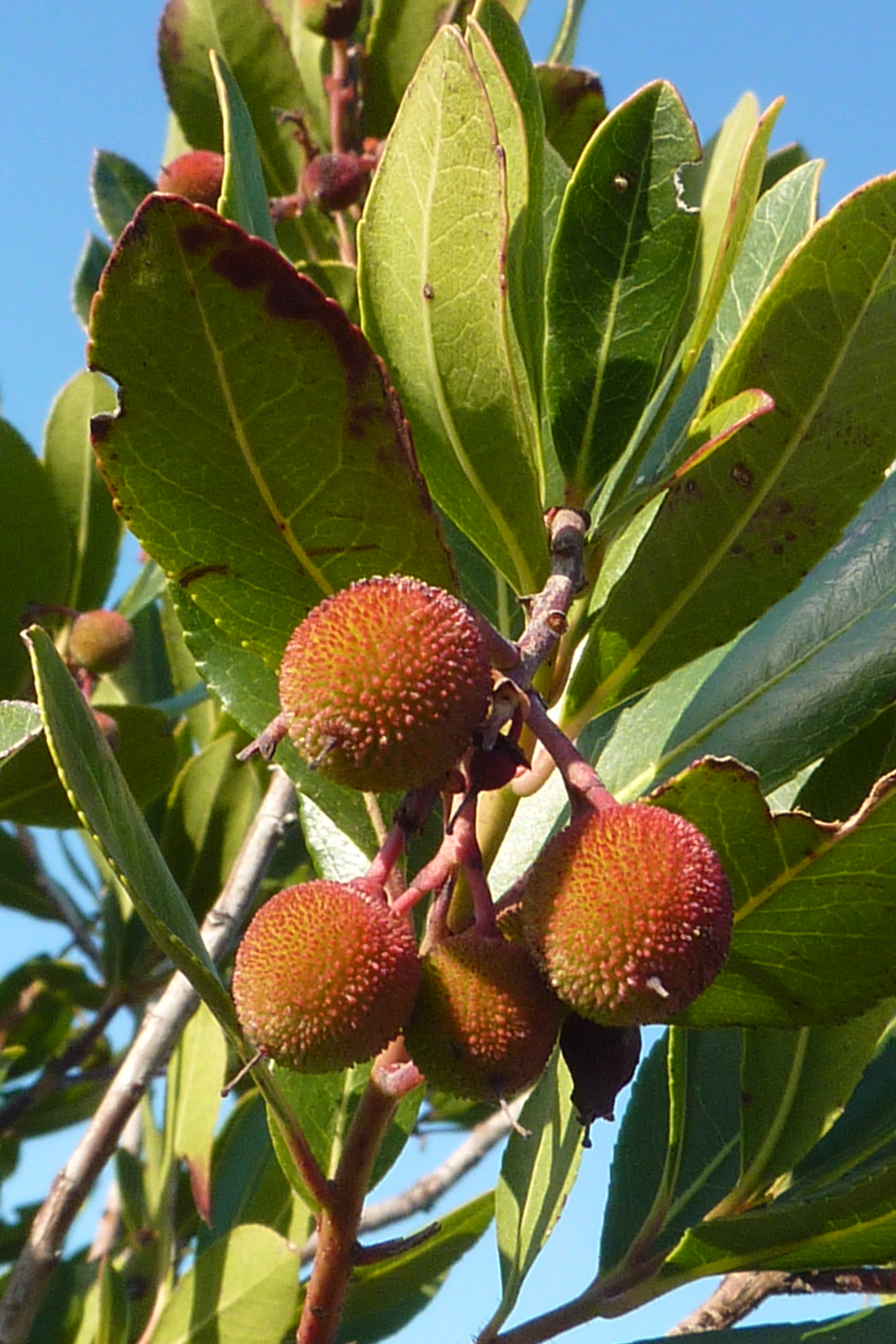
Arbutus unedo (strawberry tree) fruits in Algarve

- Cork Oak (Quercus suber): In the past, it was one of the dominant species of flora in the Algarve region. More common in the Caldeirão and Monchique mountains, it was also present on the coast of the eastern Algarve. Rare or absent in the Northeast Algarve and Lower Guadiana (municipalities of Alcoutim and Castro Marim), and the Algarve Barrocal. The number of specimens of the species has fallen dramatically due to fires, prolonged periods of drought and the "cork oak disease". Historically, it has been economically important for cork extraction activity.
- Holm Oak (Quercus rotundifolia): Dominates the tree stratum in the Algarve Barrocal, Northeast and Baixo Guadiana (concelhos of Alcoutim and Castro Marim). Common in the Caldeirão mountain range, especially in the easternmost parts of the range The species was cultivated to harvest acorns; its wood was highly prized.
- Monchique Oak (Quercus canariensis): Its presence is recorded in the Serra de Monchique and in the municipality of Odemira, but it is possible that in the past it was present in the Serra do Caldeirão. It is almost extinct in Portugal due to forest fires and the expansion of eucalyptus and maritime pine.
- Chestnut Tree (Castanea sativa): In the past, there was a large chestnut grove in the Monchique mountains. It was the first chestnut to reach the markets. It has also been recorded that this species was present in the hills of Tavira in the 18th century. Considering the existence of chestnut groves in the Serra de Aracena, it is possible that centuries ago chestnut trees were common in the wetter areas of the Algarve hills.
- Carob Tree (Ceratonia siliqua): It is debatable whether this is an introduced or an indigenous species. The species is cultivated on the coast and in the barrocal. When conditions are favorable, it can reach large dimensions. In the nineteenth century and the first half of the twentieth century, the carob tree began to be cultivated in the highlands but productivity in that sub-region is very low. Portugal is the largest producer of carob pods and the region of the Algarve is by far the greatest producer of this product.
- Poplar (Populus alba): It is probably the most common poplar in the Algarve. It occurs on the coast, especially in the eastern Algarve, forming galleries in water courses or groves in valleys. Great ornamental value, in favorable conditions can reach large dimensions
- Oak-Bark (Quercus faginea alpestris): This tree is very rare in the region due to anthropogenic action. It may have been common in the past, in the barrocal and the mountains of the windward side (Barlavento).
- Black oak (Quercus pyrenaica): It is likely that this species was present in the highest and coldest points of the Algarve hills. The black oak occurs in Andalusia, in Spain, at lower latitudes. The natural occurrence of the black oak in Portugal is recorded in Baixo Alentejo, near the Monchique mountains.
- Strawberry Tree (Arbutus unedo): This shrub is common in the mountains of the municipalities of Tavira, São Brás de Alportel, Loulé, Silves and Monchique. Absent in the Northeast Algarve. Under favorable conditions can reach 15 meters It is often associated with species of the genus Quercus, but in the past there may have been woods consisting only of strawberry trees. It is the source of medronho, a traditional fruit brandy.
- Alder (Alnus glutinosa): It occurs in riparian galleries, in permanent watercourses. It can reach 30 meters. A rare species in the Algarve, the alder can be found in the Serra de Monchique.
- Ash (Fraxinus angustifolia): It occurs especially in the eastern Algarve, especially in the valleys of the Almargem, Asseca and Beliche streams. It is possible that in the past it formed dense forests around the region's large streams. Due to the recent abandonment of agriculture, the species is regenerating in some parts of the Algarve region.
- Loendro (Nerium oleander): Forms galleries in temporary watercourses in the mountains, especially in the eastern Algarve Very common shrub in the region
- Myrtle (Myrtus communis): Shrub or small tree, with medicinal interest It occurs in some parts of the eastern mountains, but it could have been much more common in the past. As with other species of the eastern hills, the myrtle was removed due to the wheat harvest. Many specimens were also lost in 21st century's wildfires.
- Wild Olive (Olea europaea sylvestris): A medium-sized shrub or tree (up to 15 m), common on abandoned agricultural land on the coast or in the Barrocal It can reach a longevity of 2000 years.
- Terebinth (Pistacia terebinthus): Small tree or shrub Rare, only occurs in the Eastern Algarve
- Poplar (Populus nigra): Less common than Populus alba A few isolated specimens occur scattered throughout the Algarve region, near the main streams.
- Aroeira (Pistacia lentiscus): Shrub or rarely small tree, it occurs in bushes, in warmer areas of the barrocal and the coast of Algarve A very common species in the region
- Wild pear (Pyrus bourgaeana): Shrub or small tree This species is often associated with the cork oak and the holm oak in the Serra do Caldeirão.

== Education ==
State-run and private education institutions cover all the educational needs of the Algarve's population from kindergarten to university education. Primary and secondary education schools from grade 1 to grade 12, including a number of international schools (examples include Aljezur International School, Deutsche Schule Algarve, International School São Lourenço, Nobel International School Algarve, Vale Verde International School and Vilamoura International School), as well a wide network of state-run and private kindergartens are in the Algarve and in particular at the most densely populated littoral strip. The University of Algarve, headquartered in Faro, with an extension in Portimão, is a public university which awards undergraduate, integrated master, master and doctorate degrees in fields ranging from biomedical sciences, landscape architecture, agronomy or marine biology to economics, psychology, sociology or languages, literatures and cultures. The population of the Algarve is also served by two private higher education institutions (Instituto Piaget in Silves and Instituto Superior Manuel Teixeira Gomes in Portimão).

== Sports ==
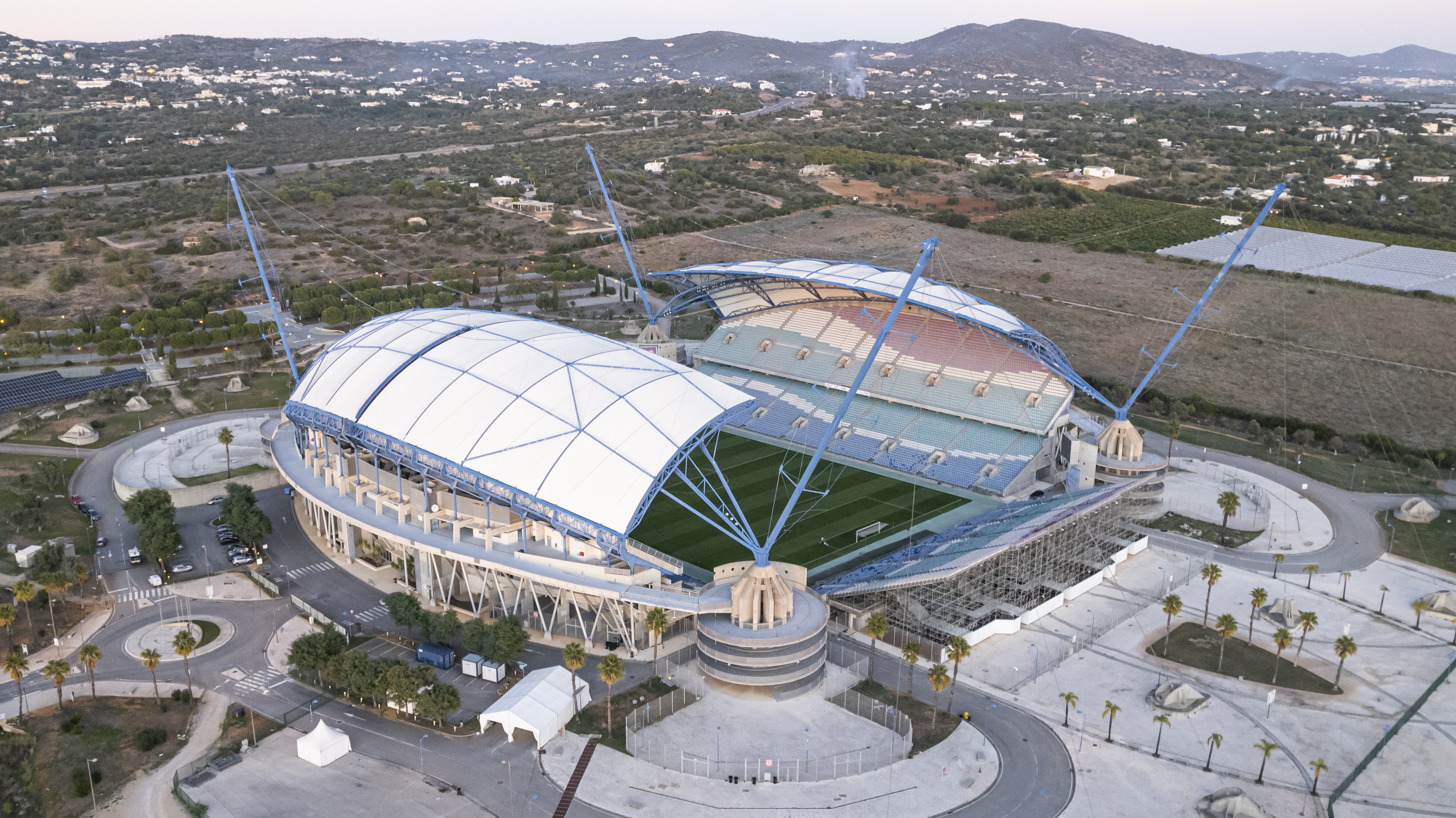
The 30,000-seat Algarve Stadium (Estádio Algarve) was built as a venue for UEFA Euro 2004.

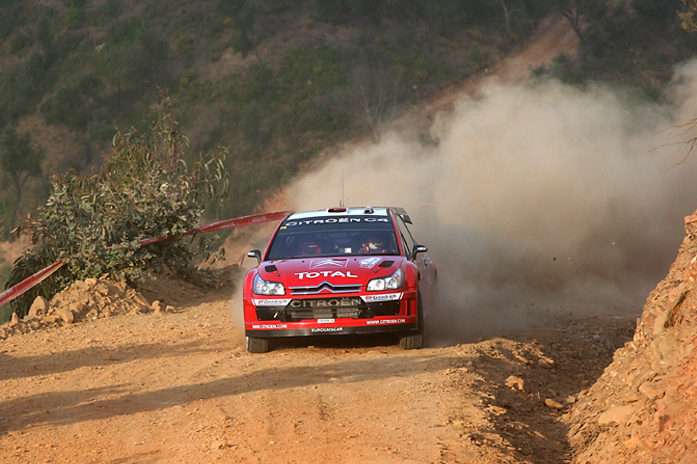
Sébastien Loeb driving his Citroën C4 WRC at the 2007 Rally de Portugal won by him. The rally included super special stages performed at the stadium.

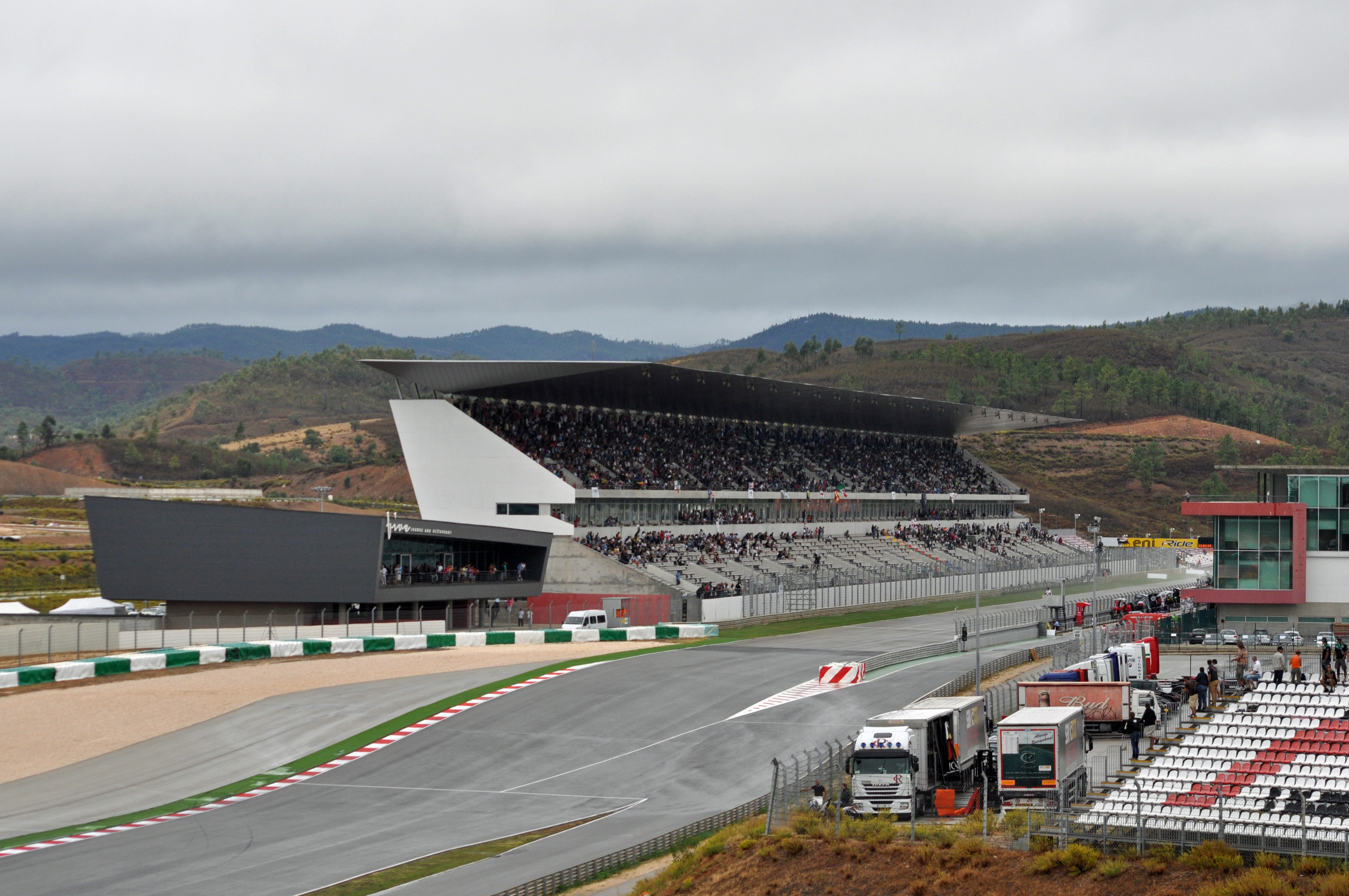
Beginning in 2020, the Algarve International Circuit has held the Formula One Portuguese Grand Prix.

Sports clubs in the Algarve include several football teams (S.C. Olhanense, Portimonense S.C., S.C. Farense, Imortal de Albufeira, Louletano D.C., C.F. Esperança de Lagos, etc.) which play in the Portuguese football league system. S.C. Farense and Portimonense S.C. are the most successful football clubs in the Algarve and usually compete in one of the two main top-tier professional football leagues in Portugal. The Algarve Cup, an invitational tournament for national teams in women's association football hosted by the Portuguese Football Federation (FPF) is held annually in the Algarve since 1994.

Cycling is a popular sport in Portugal and the region of Algarve has long-established, noteworthy professional cycling teams which compete in the Volta a Portugal and other major cycling events. The Volta ao Algarve is the oldest and most popular road bicycle racing competition in the Algarve region. The most successful of those professional cycling teams of the Algarve in the UCI Continental Tour are Louletano Desportos Clube and Clube de Ciclismo de Tavira.

The Almond Blossom Cross Country (Portuguese: Cross Internacional das Amendoeiras em Flor) is an annual international cross country running competition first organized in 1977 which takes place in Albufeira, in early March. It is one of the IAAF permit meetings which serve as qualifying events for the IAAF World Cross Country Championships.

There are numerous open-water swimming events throughout the year as well as tennis. The Algarve is also home to some of the world's most renowned golf-courses. Algarve International Circuit, a motorsport venue, is located in the region.

Due to the strong Nortada winds blowing through the South coast of Portugal, the Algarve is a summer holiday destination for windsports. Sailing, windsurfing and especially kitesurfing have a large and growing community in the Algarve. The nature of the Algarve coastline offers a mix of flat water lagoons such as those of the Ria Formosa Nature Park, or the waves of Sagres and the South-west coast.

Many kitesurfing spots dot the Algarve coastline.

== Notable natives and inhabitants ==
Examples of noteworthy people linked to the Algarve region include:

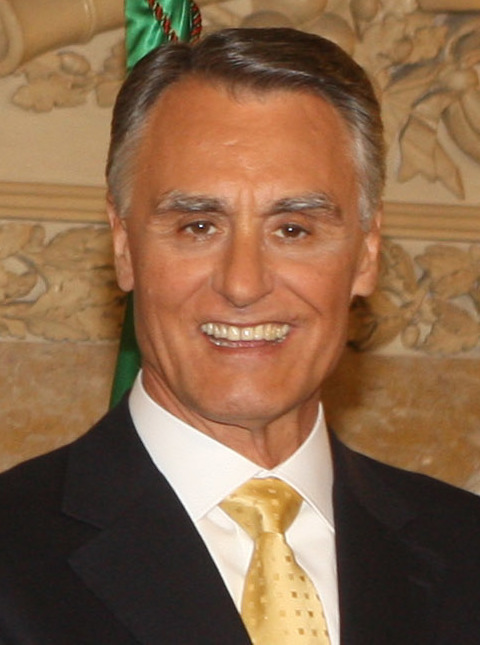
Aníbal Cavaco Silva, former Prime Minister and President of Portugal

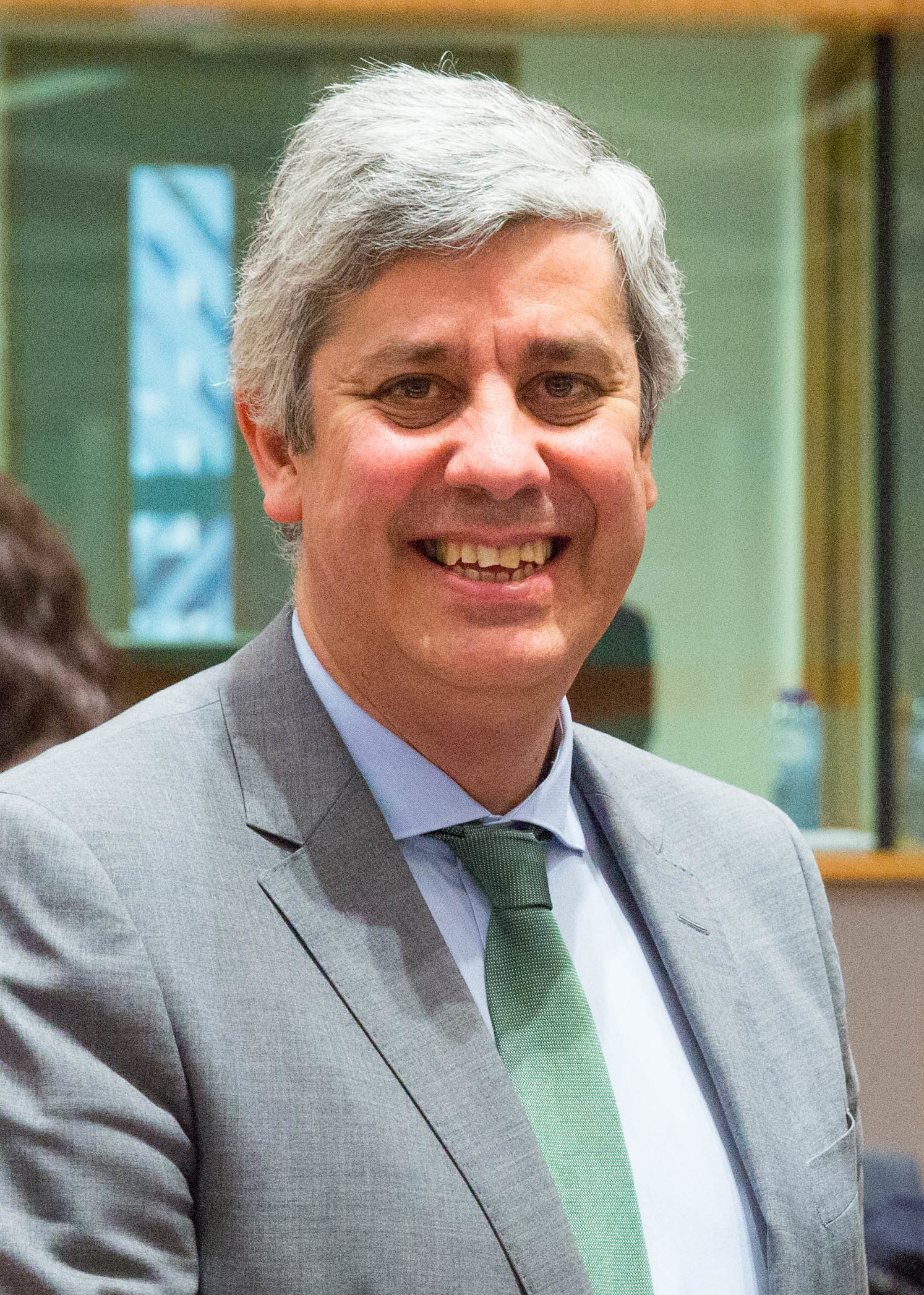
Mário Centeno, former Minister of Finance and current Governor of the Bank of Portugal

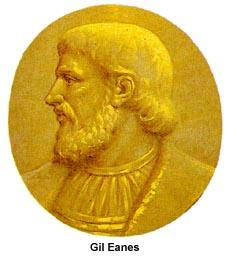
Gil Eanes, 15th-century Portuguese navigator and explorer

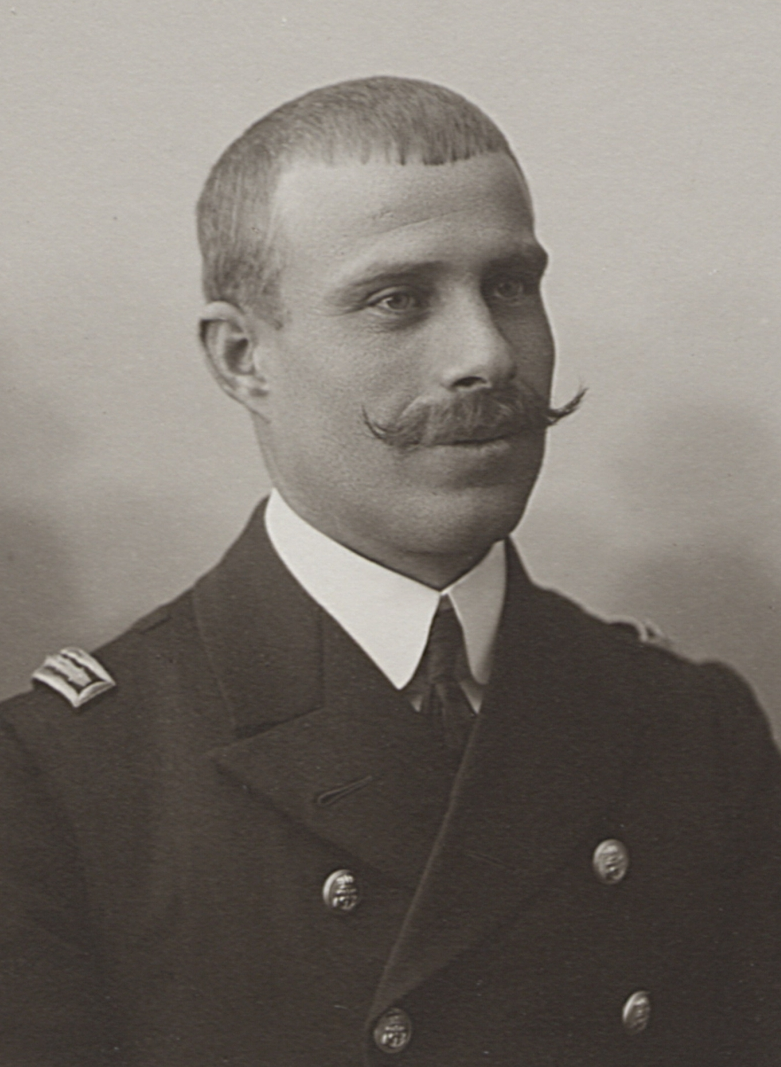
José Mendes Cabeçadas, Portuguese Navy officer, revolutionary and politician

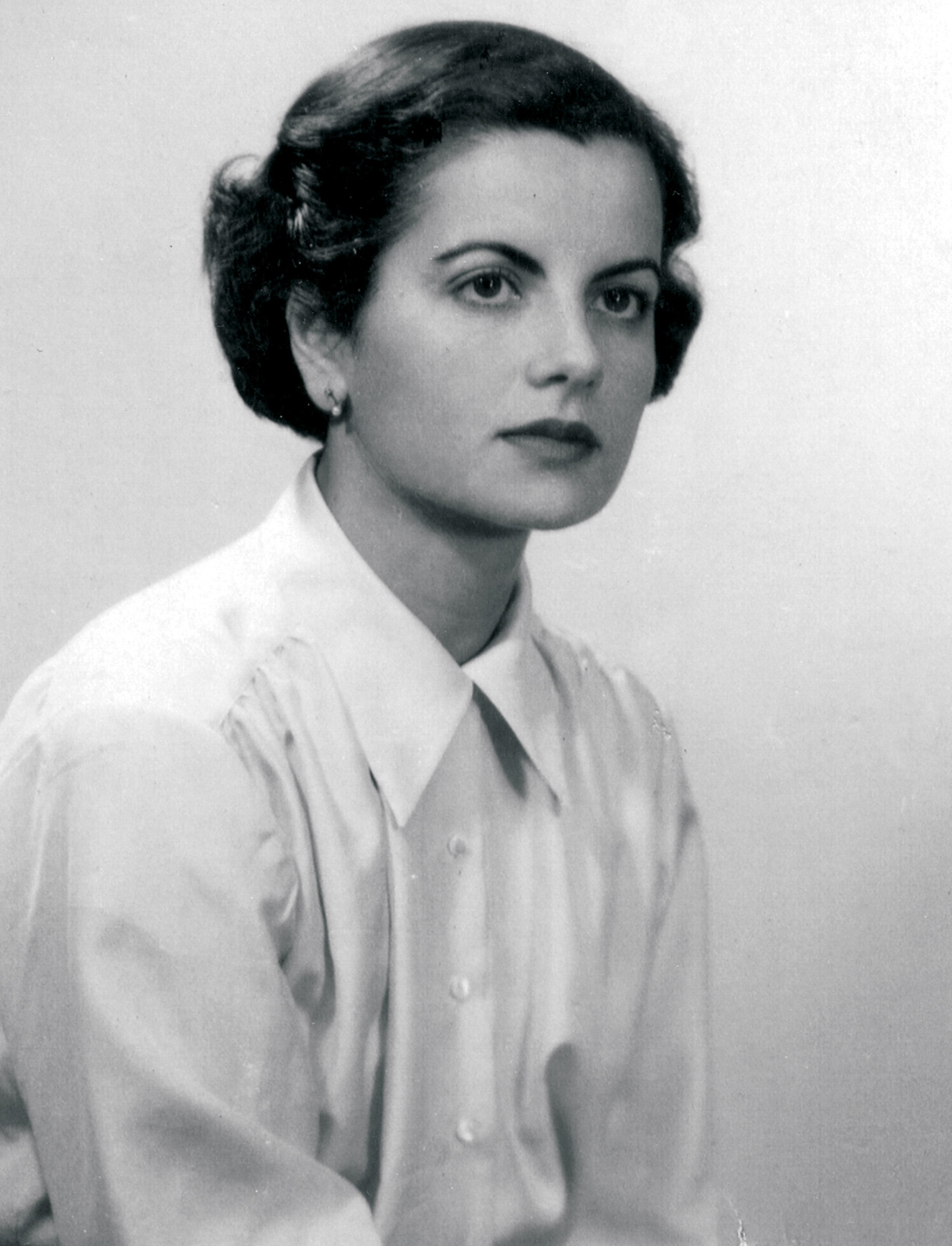
Laura Ayres, virologist

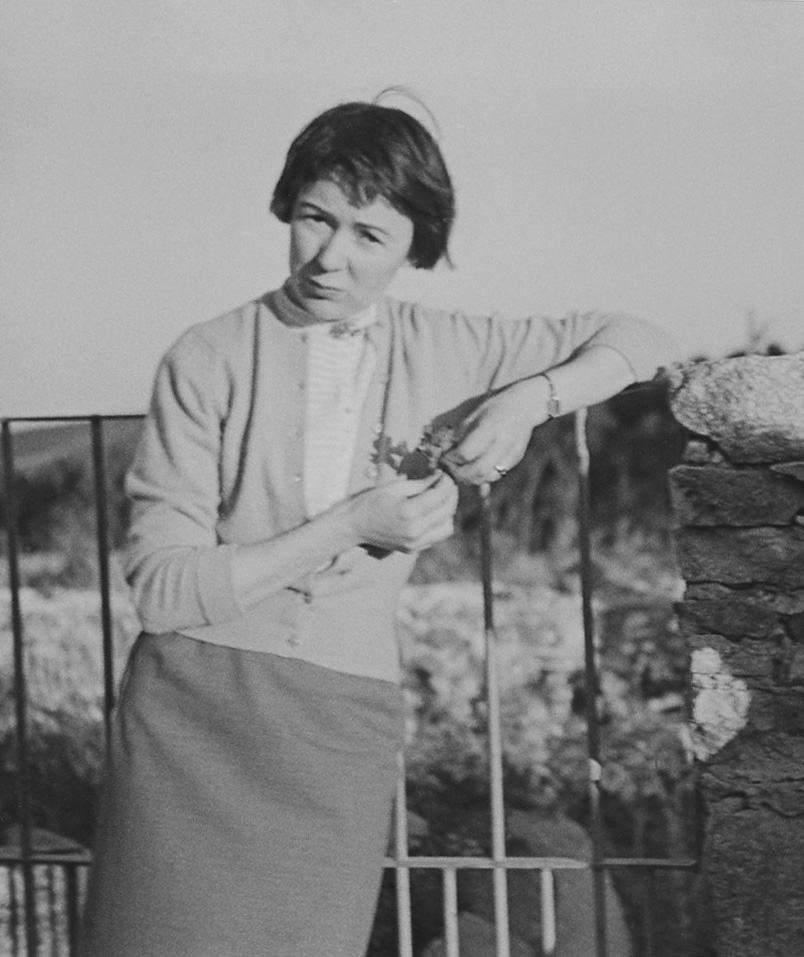
Maria Keil, visual artist

- Abu-l-Qasim Ahmad ibn al-Husayn ibn Qasi (governor of Silves for the Almohads)
- Alberto Iria (historian, a specialist in the history of the Algarve)
- Aníbal Cavaco Silva (former Portuguese president and prime minister)
- Adelino da Palma Carlos (former Portuguese prime minister)
- António Calvário (singer)
- Aurea (soul singer originally from Santiago do Cacém, Alentejo, who grew up in the Algarve)
- Bakr Ben Yahia (son of Yahia Ben Bakr, he was an important Iberian crypto-Jew living as a Christian who held political office and has been a part of important construction in Faro)
- Bartolomeu Dias (navigator)
- Bonnie Tyler (singer)
- Brites de Almeida (legendary baker of Aljubarrota)
- Carlos Brito (politician and writer)
- Carlos Quintas, Portuguese stage and television actor and singer.
- Cliff Richard (singer)
- Clive Dunn, British film and television actor (Dad's Army), from the 1980s until his death in 2012
- Dânia Neto (actress)
- David Cristina (humorist, stand-up comedian, radio and television personality, entrepreneur, corporate executive, and investment consultant)
- Diogo Piçarra (singer)
- Diogo Rodrigues (explorer of the Indian Ocean)
- Estácio da Veiga (archeologist and writer, known for having discovered several important archaeological sites in the Algarve)
- Francisco Barreto (soldier and explorer; an officer in Morocco, viceroy of Portuguese India, he was tasked with an expedition to southeast Africa in search of legendary gold mines.)
- Gil Eannes (navigator)
- Jill Adams (British actress, hotel owner)
- João Arménio Correia Martins (scientist in computational mechanics, developed the compliance friction law)
- João de Deus (priest and legal scholar)
- João de Deus (poet and editor)
- João Moutinho (football player)
- João Vaz Corte-Real (claimed by some accounts to have been a pre-Columbian explorer of a land called New Land of the Codfish, possibly part of North America)
- John Jacob Lavranos (Greek/South African insurance broker and botanist, with a special interest in succulents)
- José Mendes Cabeçadas (revolutionary, politician and former Portuguese president and prime minister)
- Júlio Dantas (writer, doctor)
- Júlio Resende (pianist and composer)
- Katherine Swift (Irish artist and ceramicist. Worked at Porches Pottery and founded Estudio Destra in Silves.)
- Laura Ayres (virologist)
- Lídia Jorge (writer)
- Louis van Gaal (Dutch football coach and former player, current manager of the Dutch National Team)
- Manuel Mendes, a businessman originally from the Algarve who is the father of Shawn Mendes, a Canadian singer-songwriter of Portuguese descent.
- Madragana (mistress to king Afonso III of Portugal)
- Manuel Teixeira Gomes (former Portuguese president and writer)
- Maria Alves da Silva Cavaco Silva (wife of Aníbal Cavaco Silva, the 19th President of the Portuguese Republic and, as such, the First Lady of Portugal from 2006 until 2016)
- Maria Barroso (actress, wife of former Portuguese president and prime minister Mário Soares)
- Mário Centeno, (Portuguese Minister of Finance since 2015, president of the Eurogroup and chairman of the Board of Governors of the European Stability Mechanism)
- Maria Keil (visual artist)
- Muhammad ibn Ammar (a poet from Silves)
- Nuno Guerreiro (singer, lead vocalist of Ala dos Namorados).
- Nuno Júdice (poet)
- Patrick Swift (Irish artist, lived in the Algarve from 1962 until his death in 1983, founded Porches Pottery/Olaria Algarve)
- Raul Pires Ferreira Chaves (a civil engineer and inventor)
- Remexido, a civil servant and wealthy land tenant who became a guerrilla leader in the Algarve, defending the rights of king Miguel to the Portuguese throne and the antiliberal status quo of the absolute monarchy
- Ronald Koeman (Dutch former football player, Coach)
- Sara Martins (Portuguese-born French actress of Cape Verdean descent originally from the Algarve)
- Yahia Ben Bakr, an important Iberian Christian of Jewish origin living under Muslim domination in Gharb al-Andalus who was a member of a family of muladís who revolted in the year 879 against the power of the Emir of Cordoba, remaining independent for about 50 years

== Gallery ==
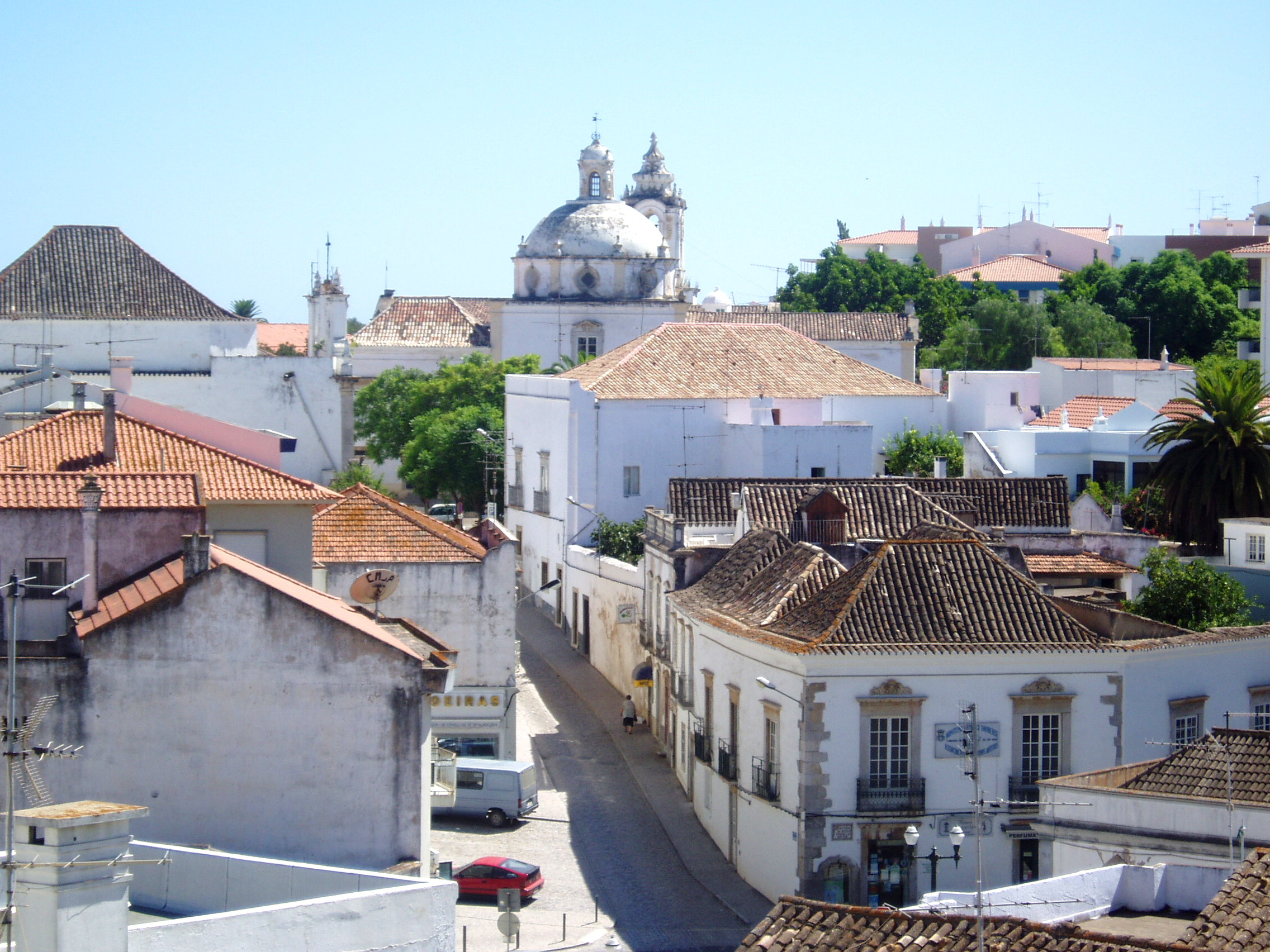
The city of Tavira, capital of the Costa do Acantilado

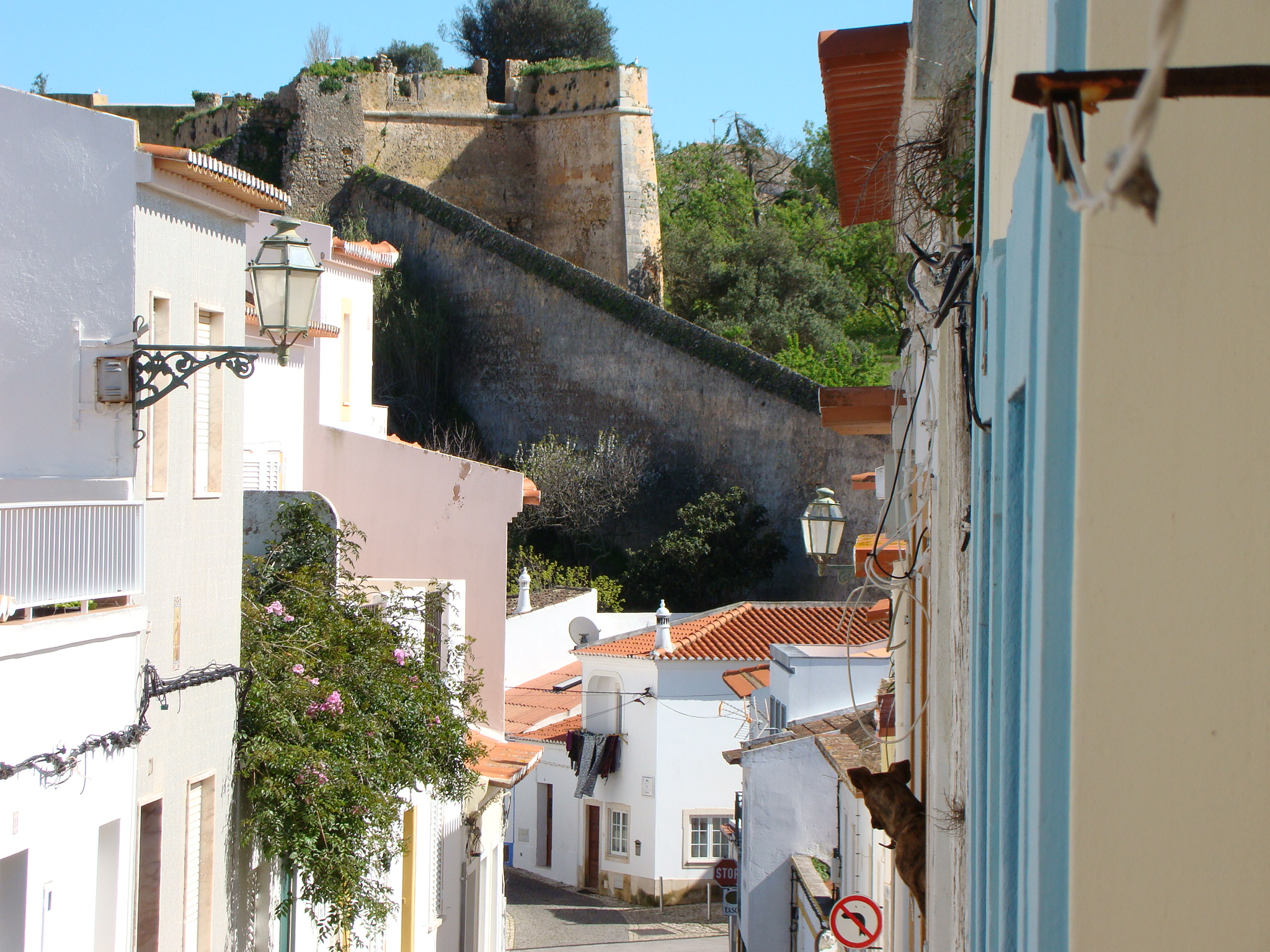
The historic centre of Lagos

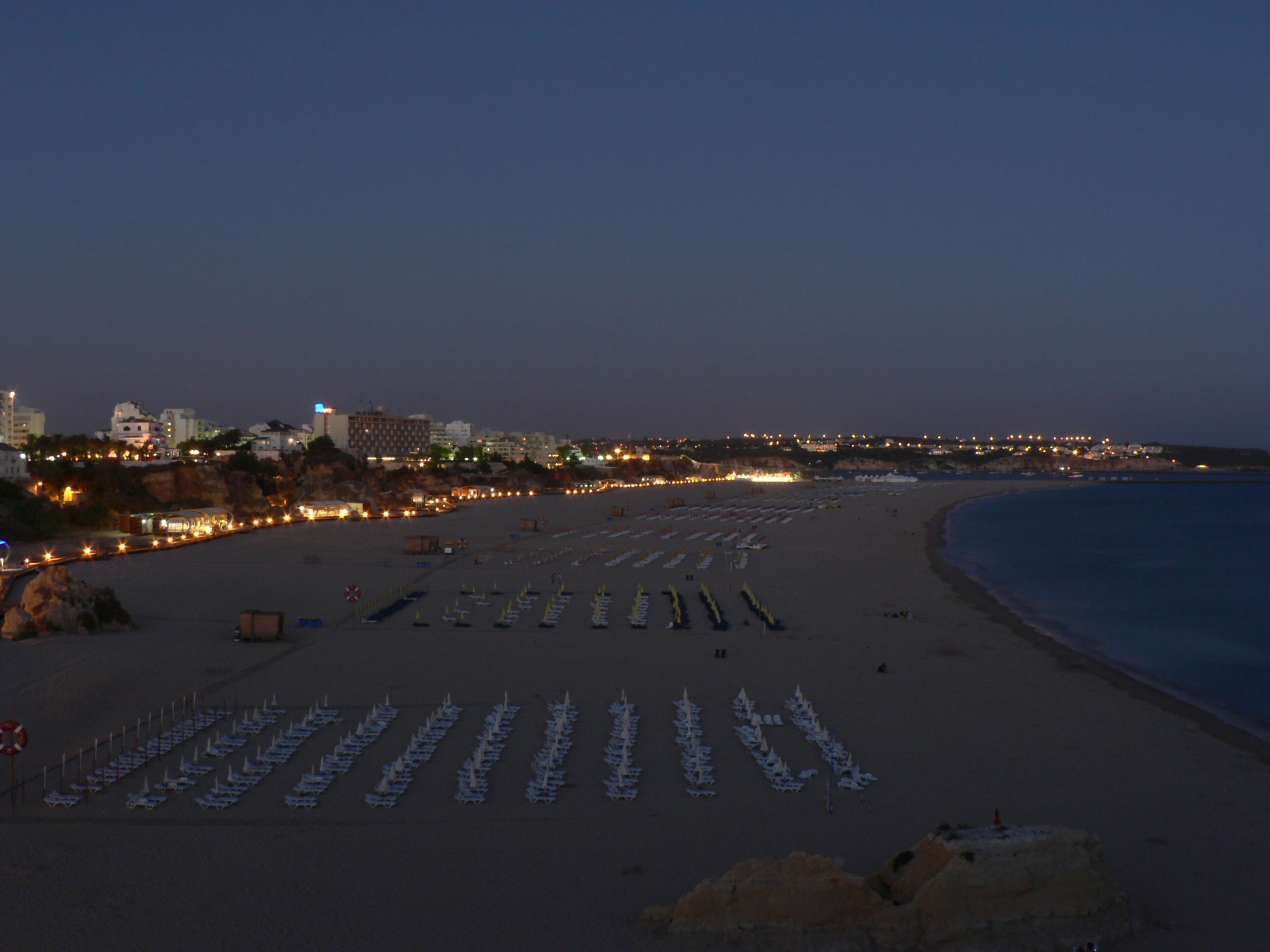
Portimão at night

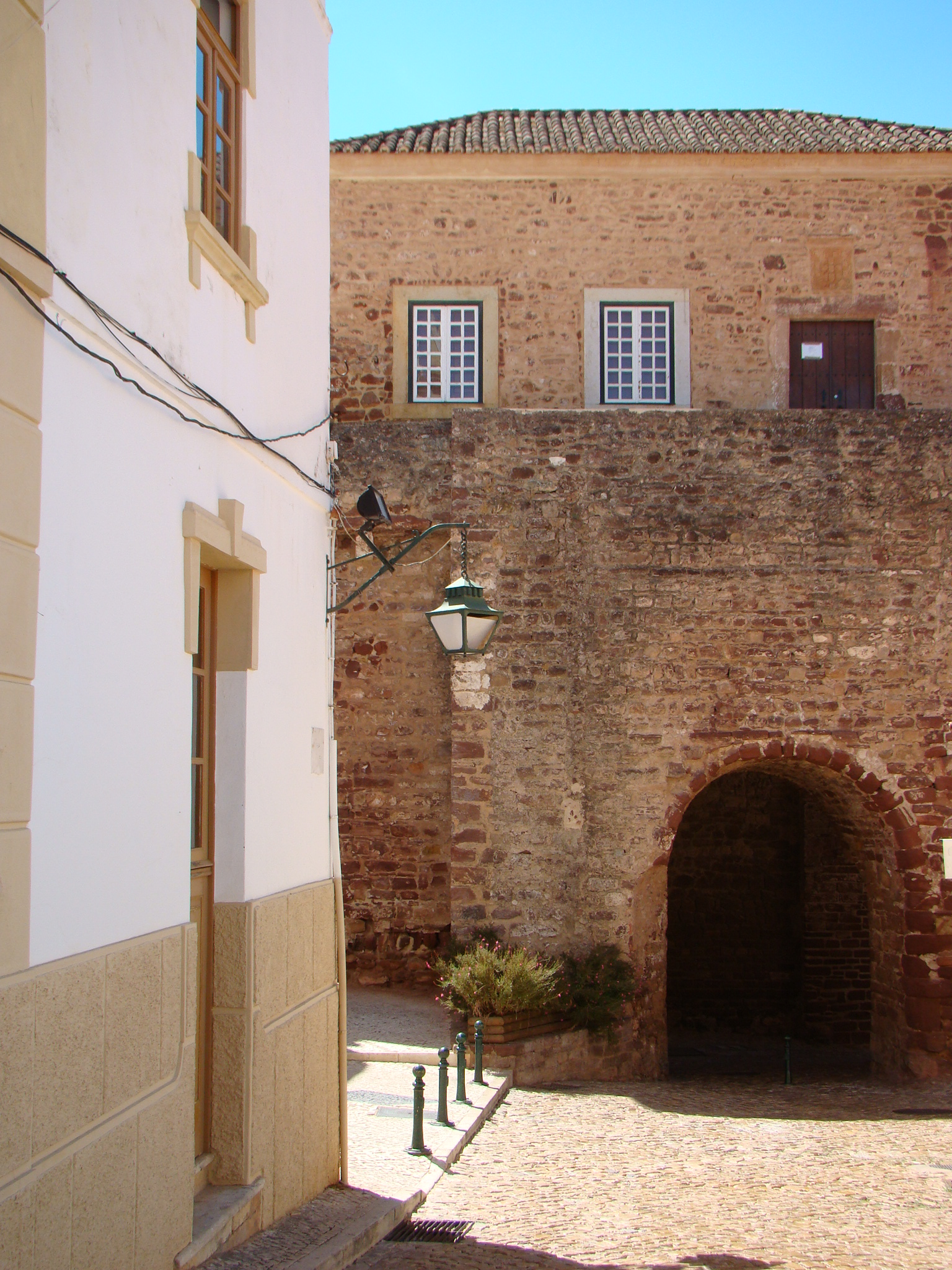
A street in Silves

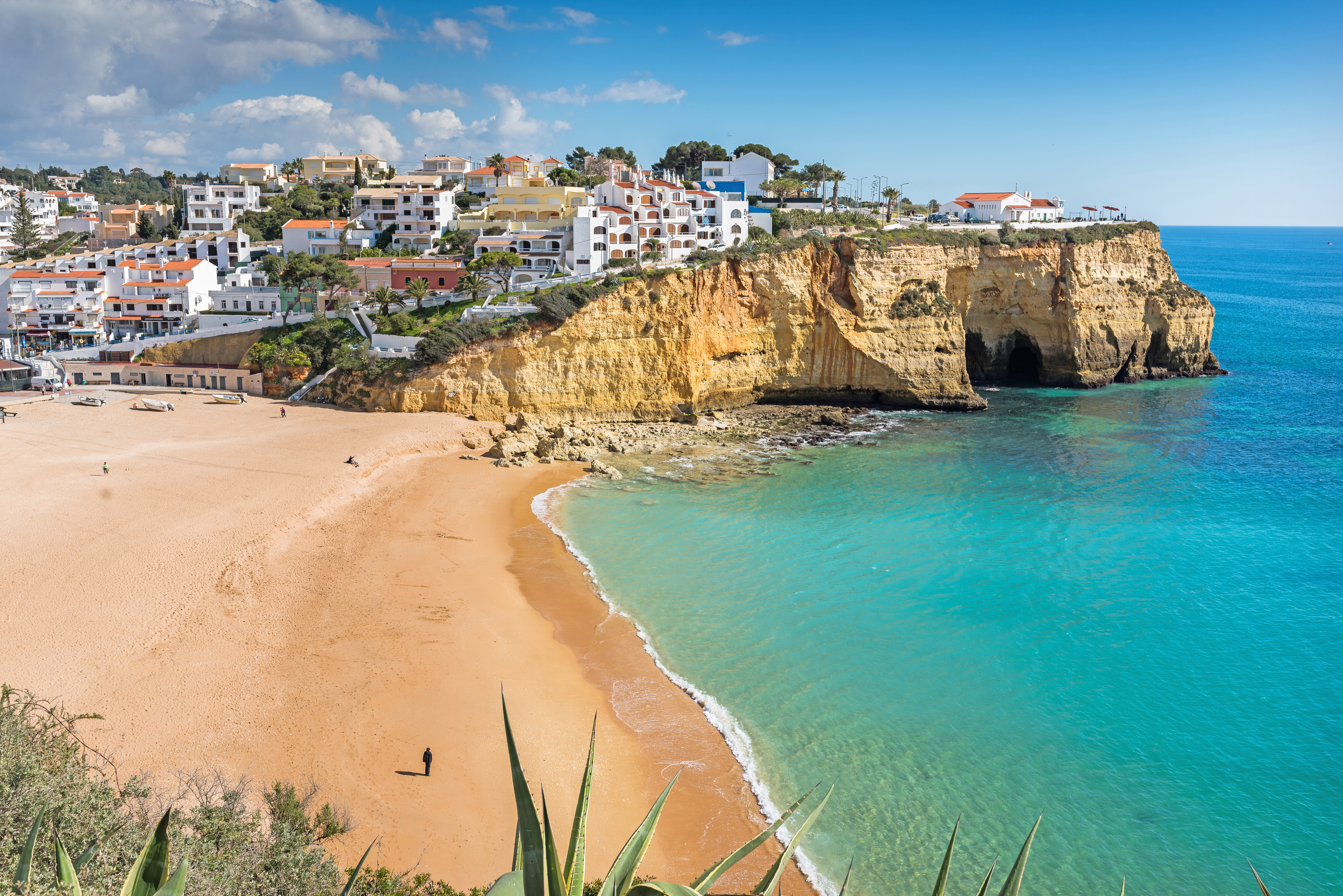
Partial view of Carvoeiro

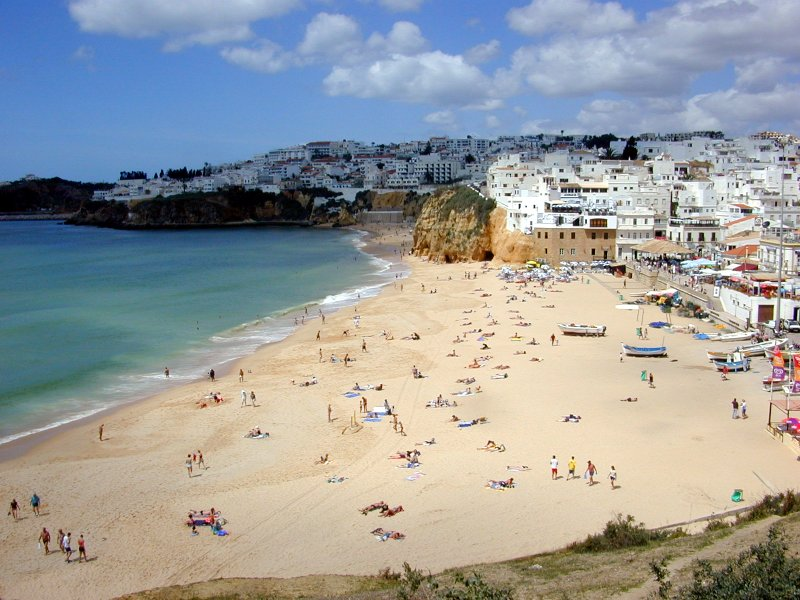
A beach in Albufeira

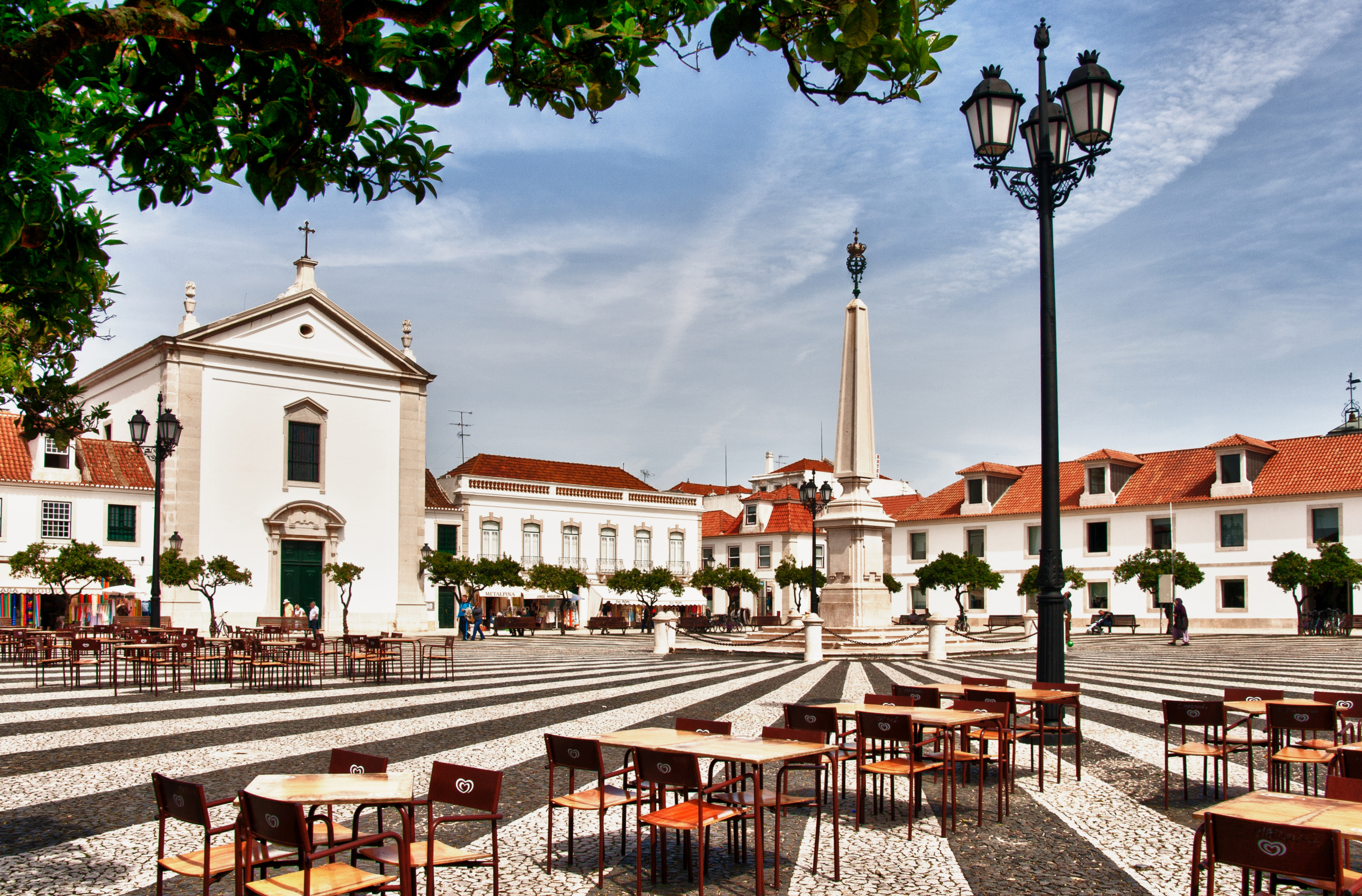
The city of Vila Real de Santo António

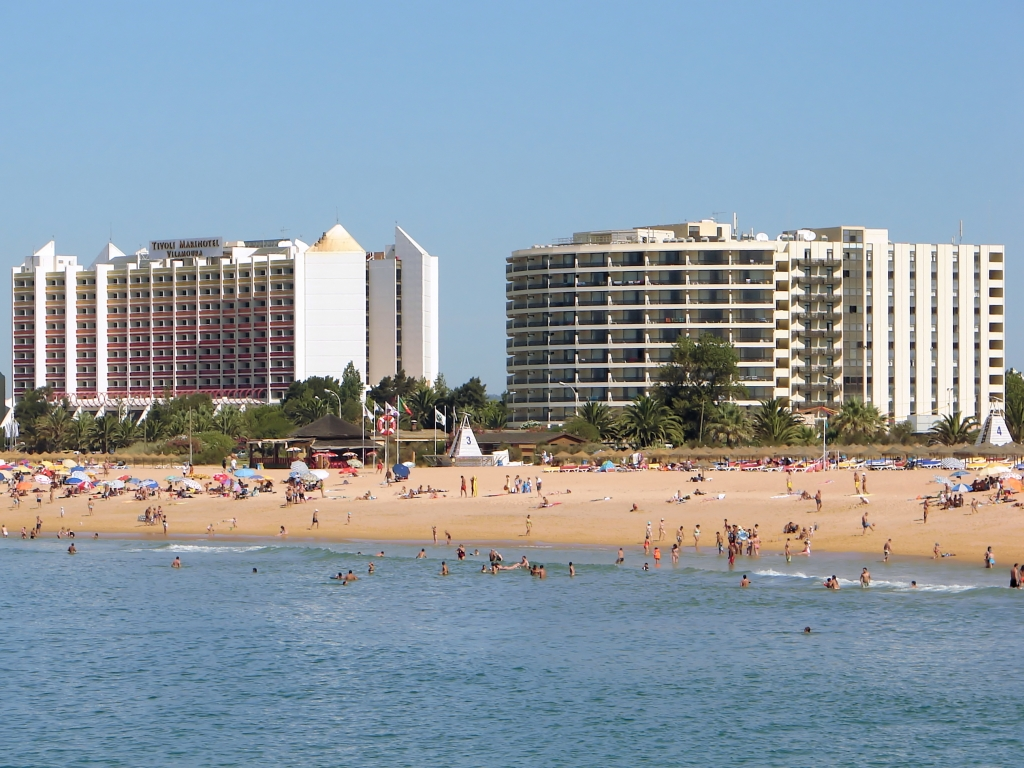
Marina beach in Vilamoura

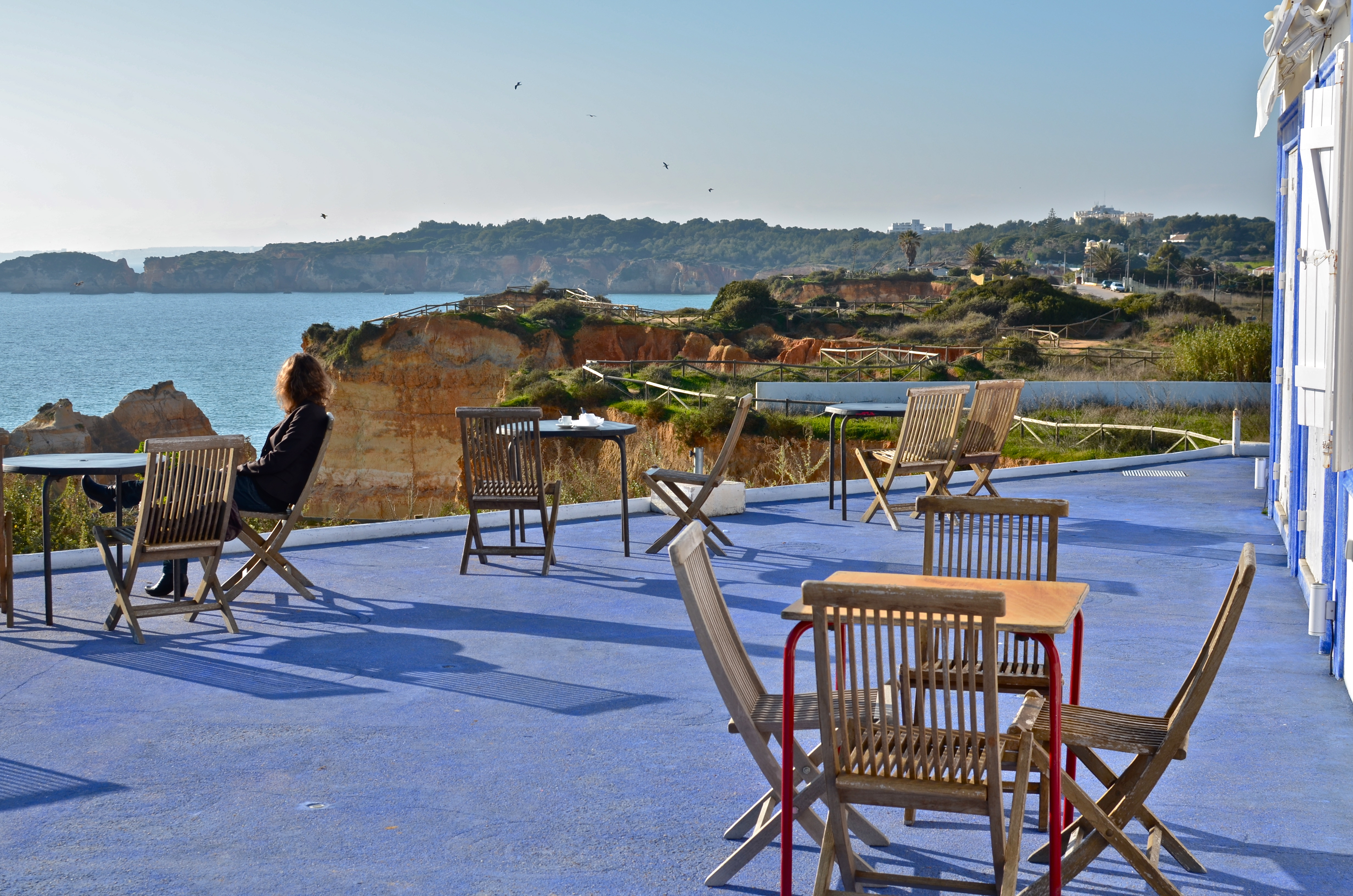
Typical view of the Algarve coast

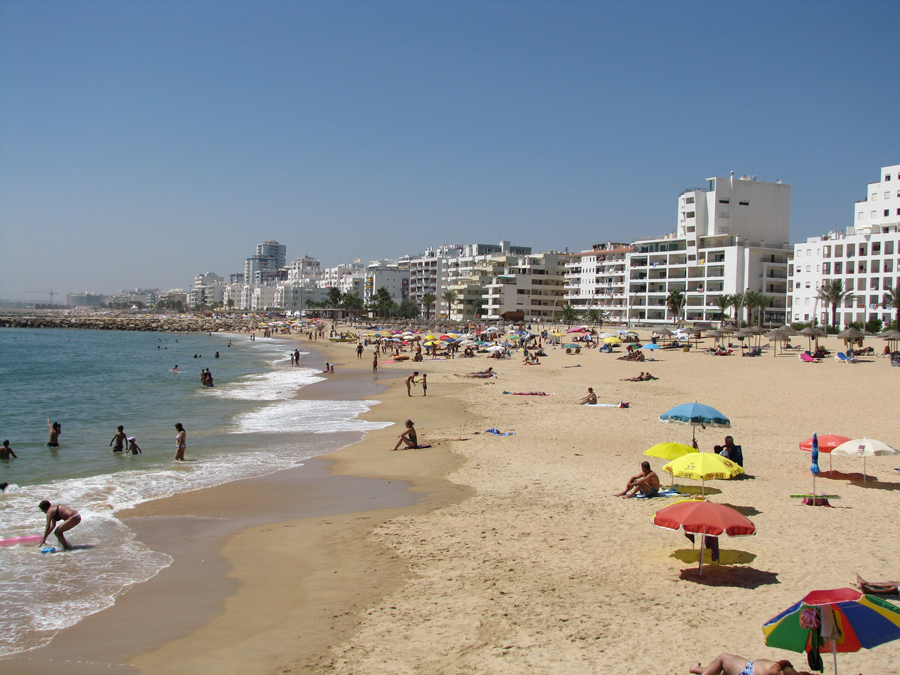
Beach in Quarteira

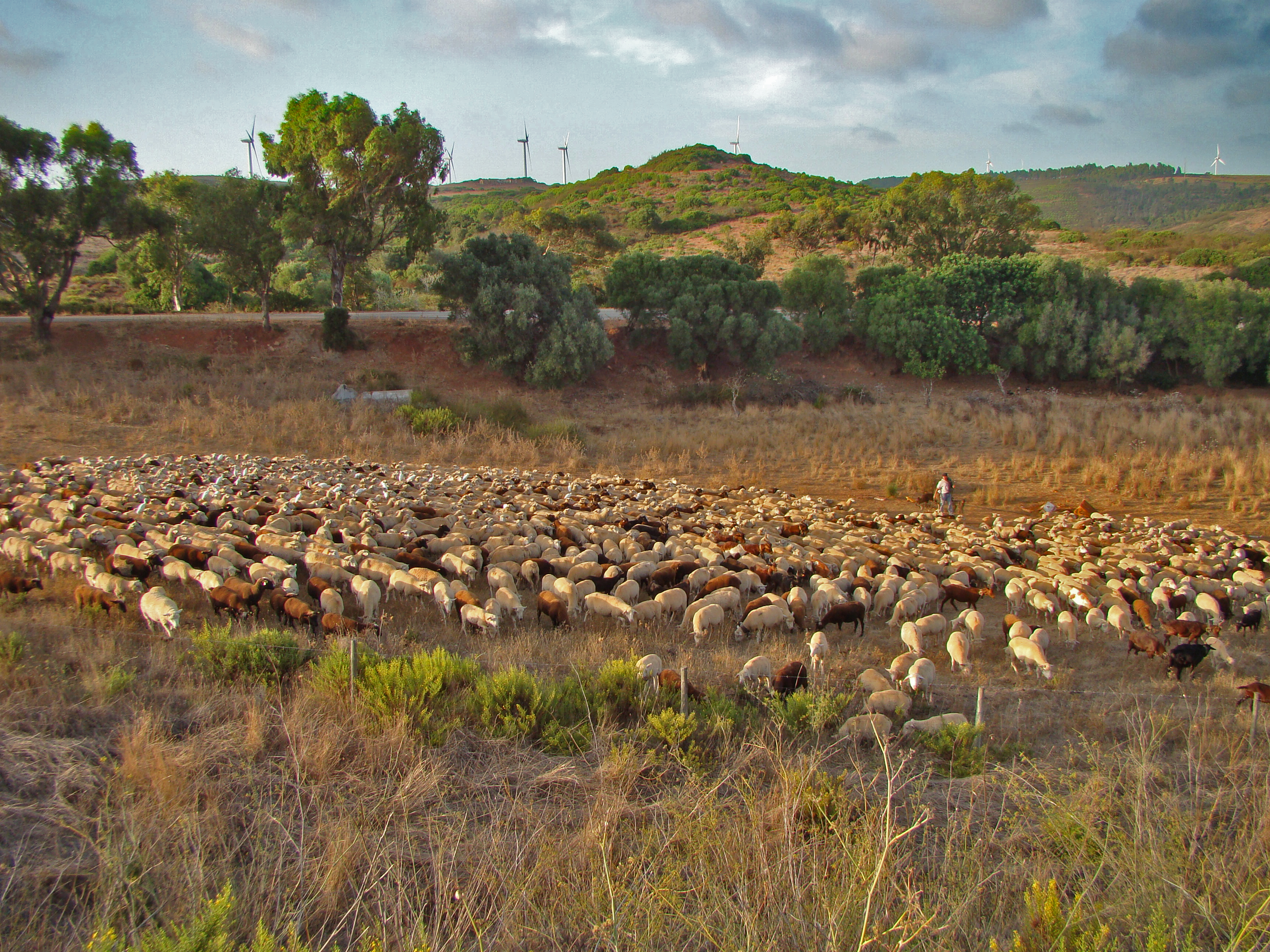
Shepherd and sheep near Lagos

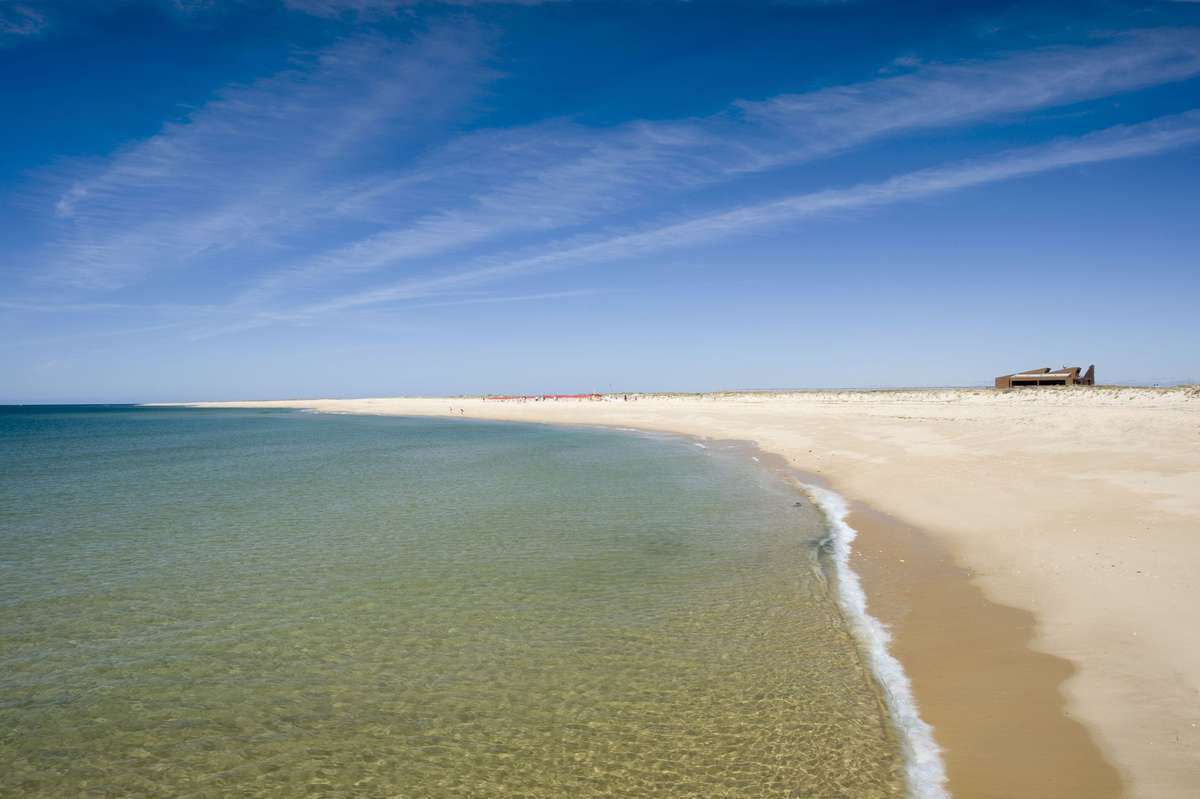
Desert island near Faro

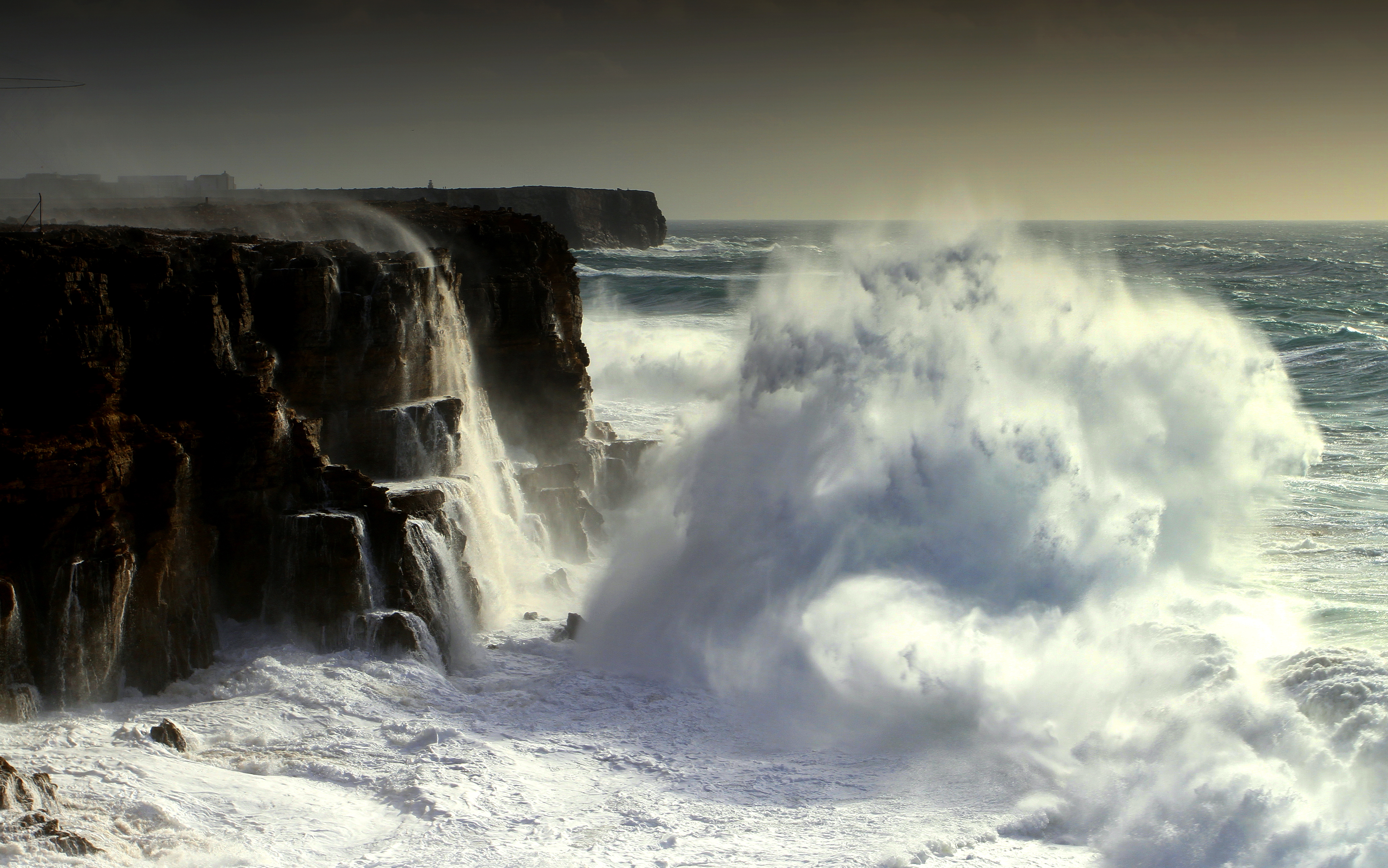
Sagres Point, in the extreme of continental Portugal

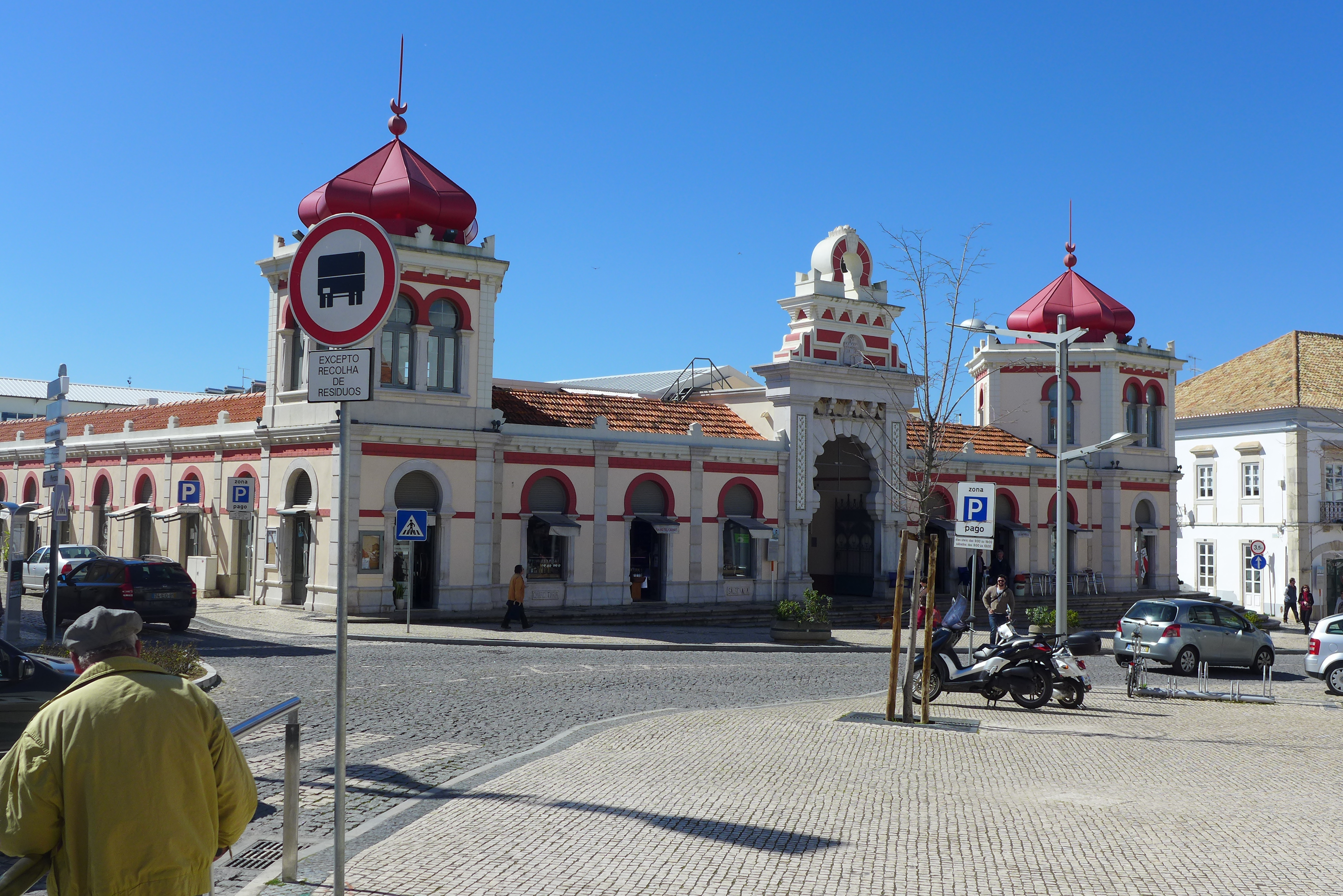
Loulé's municipal market

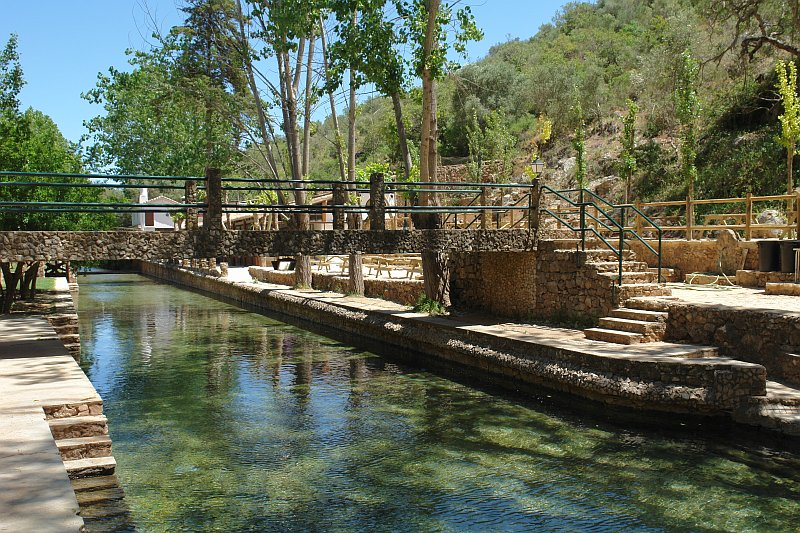
The bog fountain in Alte

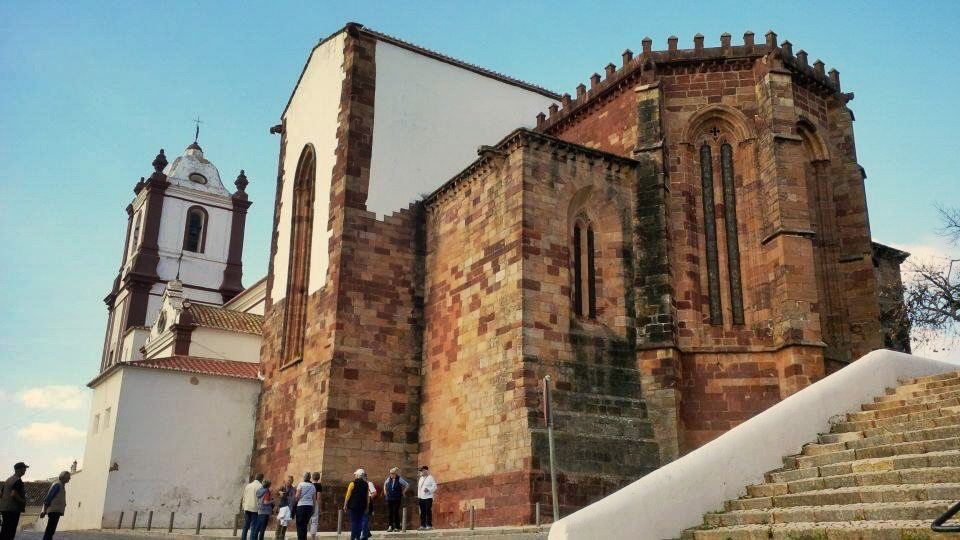
Silves Cathedral

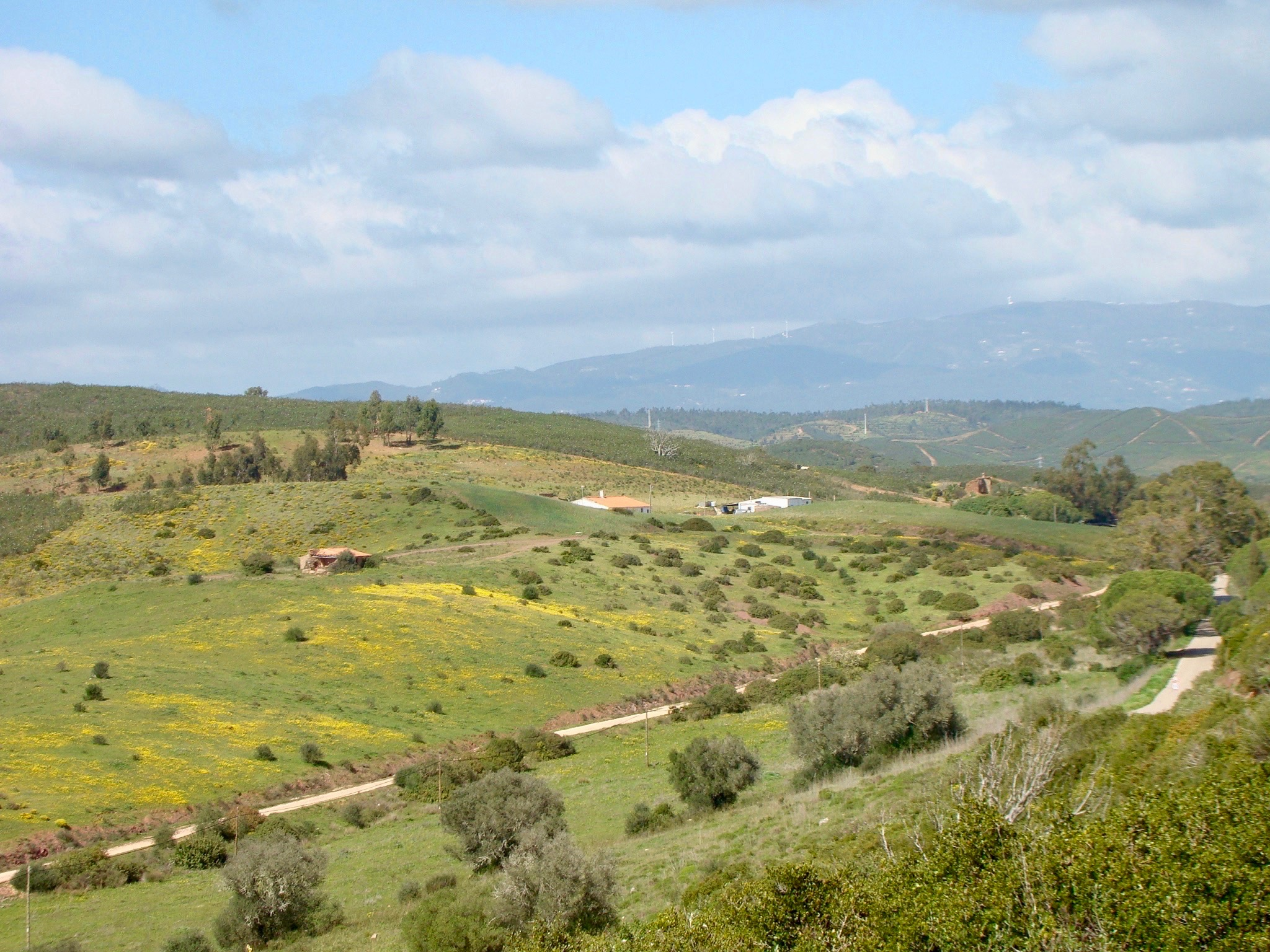
The open fields of the Algarve in spring

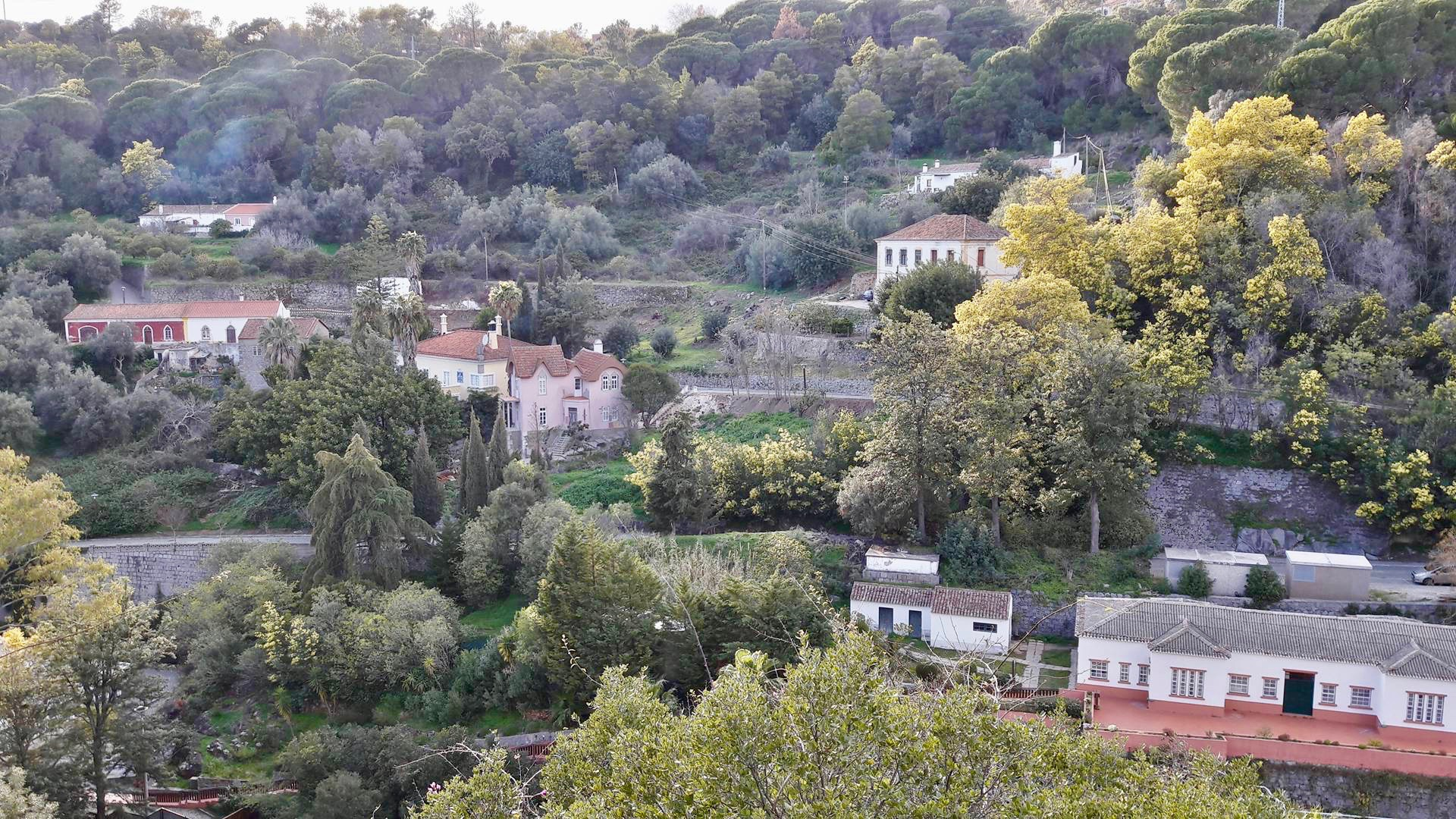
The spa resort town of Caldas de Monchique

== See also ==
- Kingdom of the Algarve
- Algarve VR
- History of Lagos (Portugal)
