= History of Lagos, Portugal =

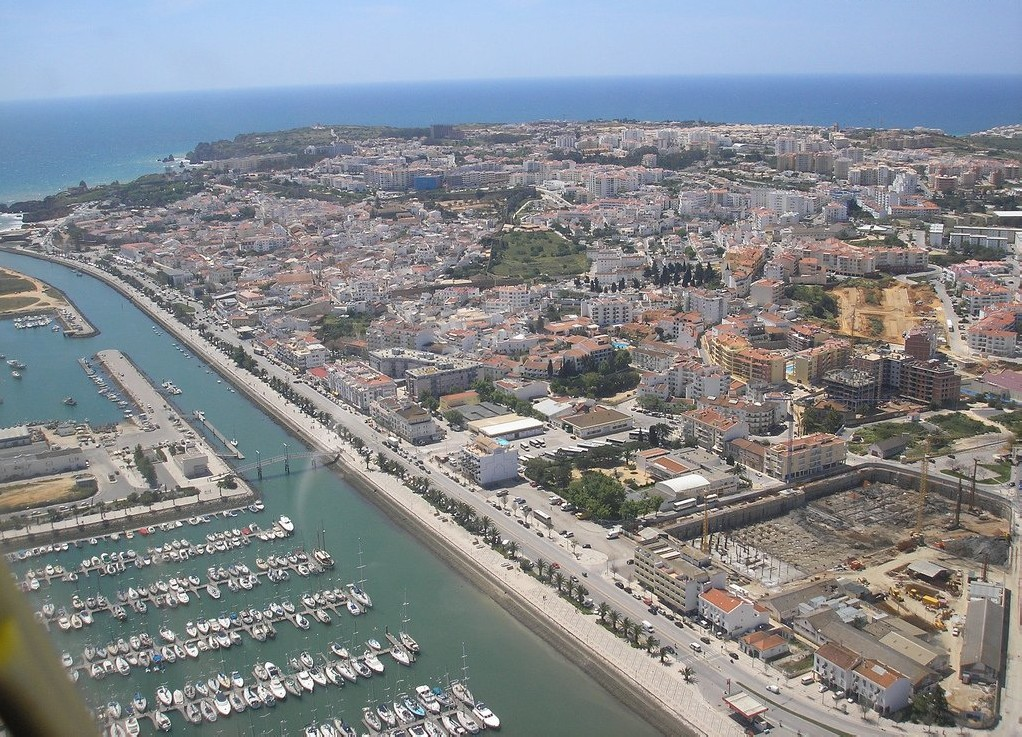
Aerial view of Lagos.

Lagos is a city in the District of Faro, in Portugal. According to tradition, the city was founded about 2,000 years before the Birth of Christ, having been under rule by the Carthaginians, Romans and Muslims. After the Christian reconquest, it played a leading role in the Portuguese Discoveries, becoming the main city in the Algarve, a position it lost to Faro after the devastating earthquake of 1755. Recovery was hampered by the French invasions and the Portuguese Civil War, only regaining some importance in the mid-19th century, with the development of industries, mainly canning. After World War II, a phase of replacement of industrial activities by tourism is witnessed, whose economic importance marks the transition to the Third Millennium.

== Prehistory and early colonization ==
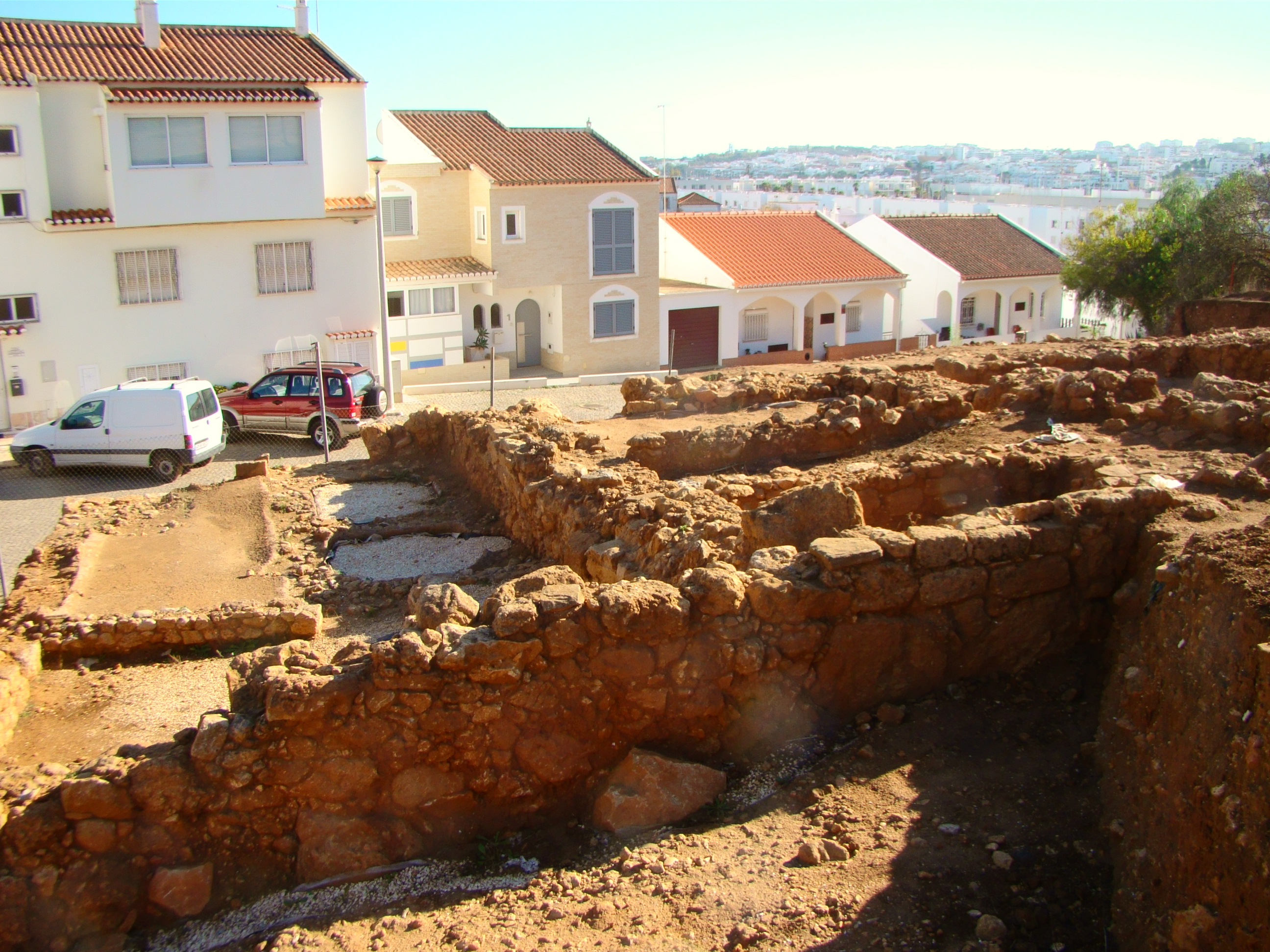
Monte Molião, which preserves parts of a Celtic defensive (walled) structure dating back to the late 5th and 3rd century BC.

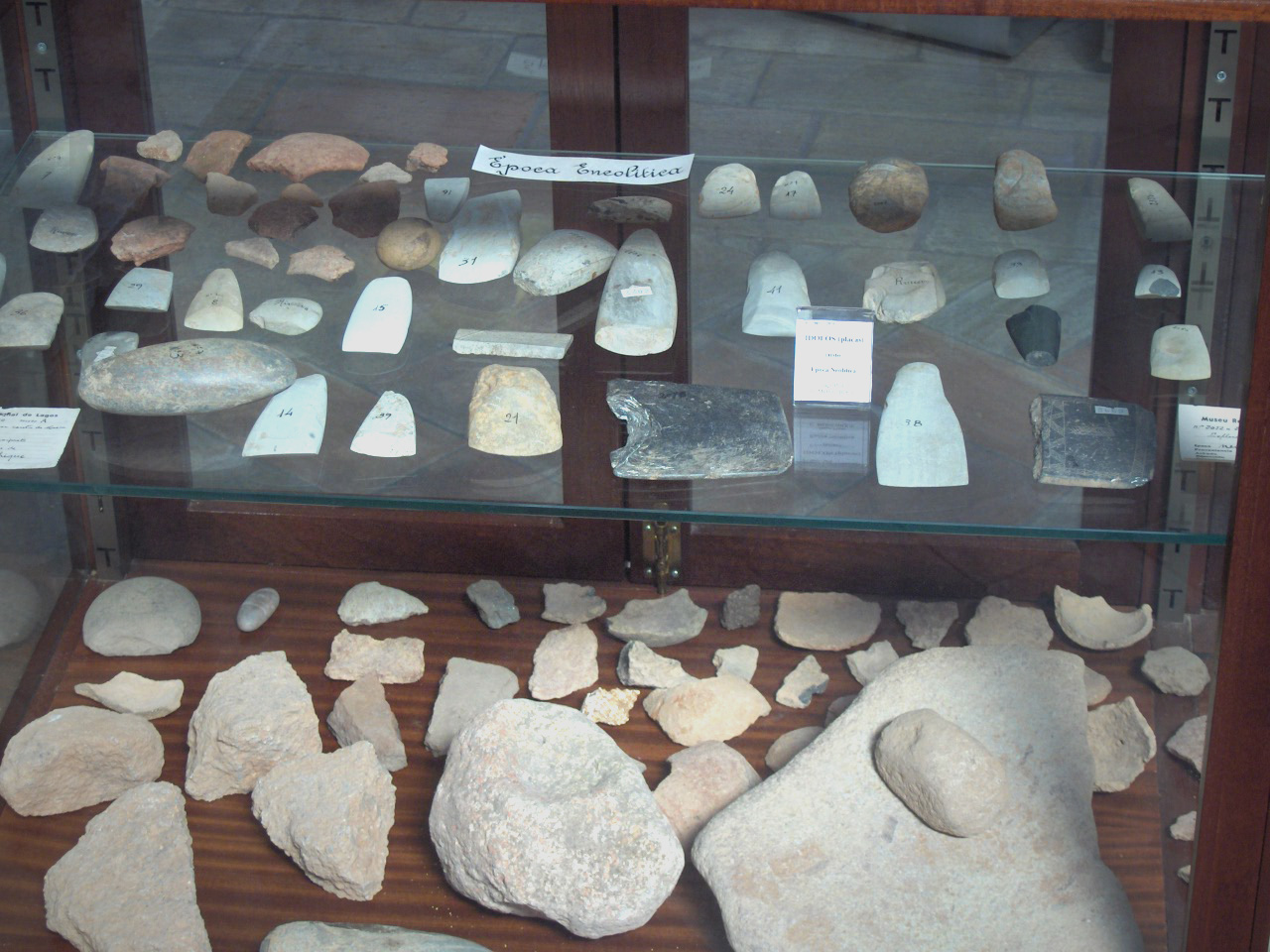
Neolithic remains at the Lagos Museum.

The human presence in the territory that would later become Portugal began in the Lower Paleolithic, as can be proven by the remains of a pre-Acheulean lithic industry. During the Stone Age there was already a rudimentary fishing activity on the Lagos coast, using hooks made from deer antlers, which were found by archaeologist Estácio da Veiga in caves. It is estimated that at that time there were a large number of deer in the region, as more tools made from the antlers have been found, and which were used for harvesting and sowing wheat, barley, vegetables, etc... Until the Roman conquest, boats made of leather were used for fishing, as hides for waterproofing, and with masts made of thin wood, so that they were easy to bend and thus not damaged by the wind. The products of the Lagos fishery, especially tuna and sardines, which were exported salted, became very famous during the ancient civilizations, and were part of the trade between Turdetania and North Africa. The historian Faria e Castro reported that in his time there were still traces of the great fisheries that took place in antiquity, especially of tuna, which was transported in brine to Carthage, where it was highly appreciated. To confirm this theory, Faria e Castro cited several ancient authors, such as Athenaeus, Pliny and Strabo, who claimed that tuna fishing was already quite old on the coast of Lusitania. The historian also mentioned that the transport of salted fish even reached Greece, during the time of Hippocrates. One of the known habits of sailors was to sacrifice a tuna to the god Neptune, when the fishing was very abundant.

During the period before the Christian era, the Iberian Peninsula was inhabited mainly by the Iberian people, and invaded by the Celts in the 4th century BC, who eventually merged into the Celtiberians. According to tradition, in about 1899 BC, a settlement called Lacobriga was founded in the area where present-day Lagos is located, although the location of this urban nucleus has not been completely determined, with Fonte Coberta, Serro da Amendoeira, Paúl, Figueira da Misericórdia, and Monte Molião having been put forward as hypotheses, the latter being considered the most probable site. The formation of the city is linked to a legend in which a grandson of Tubal, called Brigo, the fourth king of Hispania, built several fortified cities along his territory, which were named Brigos after their founder. This legend was also related in a manuscript called "Fundação de Lagos" (Foundation of Lagos), which was part of the library of the Senhora da Glória Convent, and which stated that Brigo, in the year of the creation of the world 1839, the flood of 2145 and 2161 BC, had founded a settlement in the place later known as Paúl da Abedoeira, which was named Lacobriga, combining both the nature of the area and the name of its founder. Father João Baptista Carvalho estimated that the city of Lacobriga had been created in 1006 BC, based on the work "Euchiridion de los Tiempos", while the "Encyclopedia Portuguesa Illustrada – Diccionario Universal" mentioned that according to Father Cardoso Rodrigues, Mendes da Silva and other authors, the city had been built by Brigo in 1899 BC. The "Diccionario Corographico" de Francisco Cardoso de Azevedo informed that according to some sources, the city had been created in 1897 BC by Brigo, while others pointed to the Carthaginians as founders. The historian Florião do Campo, on the other hand, stated that the city had been founded by the Lakons. The term Brigo was explained by the journal "Archeologo Portuguez" as having a Celtic origin, meaning fortress. The works "Corographia do Algarve" and "História do Regimento de Infantaria n.º 15" put forward Paul's site as the probable location of the ancient city, a theory corroborated by the archaeologist Estácio da Veiga, who identified that site as the Lacobriga described by Pomponius Mela. In fact, several vestiges of Roman occupation were found at Paul's site. According to the "Archivo Historico de Portugal", Lacobriga was located about 1,500 m away from the center of the current city of Lagos, while other authors thought it would have been located on Monte Molião, a hill about 1,200 m from the center, which was excavated by Estácio da Veiga, where prehistoric remains were found, such as crockery and animal bones, and Roman ones, such as a cemetery, crockery and other objects, and several structures, including a cistern about 4 m deep. The site of Lacobriga was also found at the Paul's site.

Political and ethnolinguistic map of the Iberian Peninsula, around 300 BC.

Ancient geographers referred to the existence of two cities named Lacobriga, with Antoninus describing an even greater number. The hypothesis that ancient Lacobriga was the city of Lagoa has been put forward, but it is unlikely, since this location is far from both the ocean and Cape St. Vincent, while ancient Lacobriga was described as being maritime, and near Cape Sacrum. Another hypothesis is that ancient Lacobriga was located in Alvor, named Portus Hannibalis during the Roman period. This theory was supported by the geographer Niderndorff, who stated that Lacobriga had previously been named Portus Hannibalis.

== Contact with the Phoenicians and Carthaginian Domain ==
According to several historians quoted by João Paulo Rocha in 1910, the first Phoenicians arrived in the Iberian Peninsula around 935 BC, to search for gold and silver, having returned a few years later with a larger fleet, which reached as far as Cape St. Vincent In the city of Lagos several Phoenician remains have been found, such as ceramics found in Barroca Street, dating from the 8th to the 7th century BC, However, the contacts with the native peoples were not always friendly, leading to clashes with the Phoenicians, which is why they would have asked their Carthaginian allies for help. These arrived in the Peninsula around 600 BC, where they settled. Another civilization that also had contact with the peoples of the Iberian Peninsula was the Greek, who established commercial colonies at various points along the coast of the peninsula. According to the opinion of Pliny the Elder and other historians of antiquity, the contacts with these three civilizations and later with the Celts were very beneficial for the Turdetans, among whom were the Lacobrigans, who reached a point of superior development in cultural and production terms in relation to the other Lusitanian peoples. Indeed, the progression of agricultural techniques allowed for the export in large quantities of wheat, wine, wax and olive oil, while a developed fishing industry and the existence of salt pans made it possible to export fish. In addition, they also produced wax dishes, and wove cloths with geometric designs, with which they made clothing known as sentulatas.

According to the historian Strabo, the city was conquered by the Carthaginians, led by Hamilcar Barca. According to legend, when it was conquered it had the horses' troughs, the jugs and the jars for wine and water made entirely of silver, which showed the wealth of the city, despite having suffered from several conquest attempts by different peoples. Ancient chroniclers assumed that the city was ruined during Carthaginian rule, and that it was almost completely destroyed in an earthquake and consequent tsunami in the 4th century BC. The city was rebuilt on a new site by Captain Bodo, who had been sent from Carthage to succeed Hanno. Various dates have been advanced for the founding of the new city, such as 250 or 300 BC, Pomponius Mela and Laimundo de Ortega both proposed 400 BC. However, the ancient city on Monte Molião continued to be inhabited. The city experienced a period of great prosperity during Carthaginian rule, due to the great fishing and agricultural production, coral catching, and the large bay that was much sought after by ships as it was sheltered from the prevailing north and northeast winds, and Bodo also established an important fair, which brought a large number of outsiders to the city.

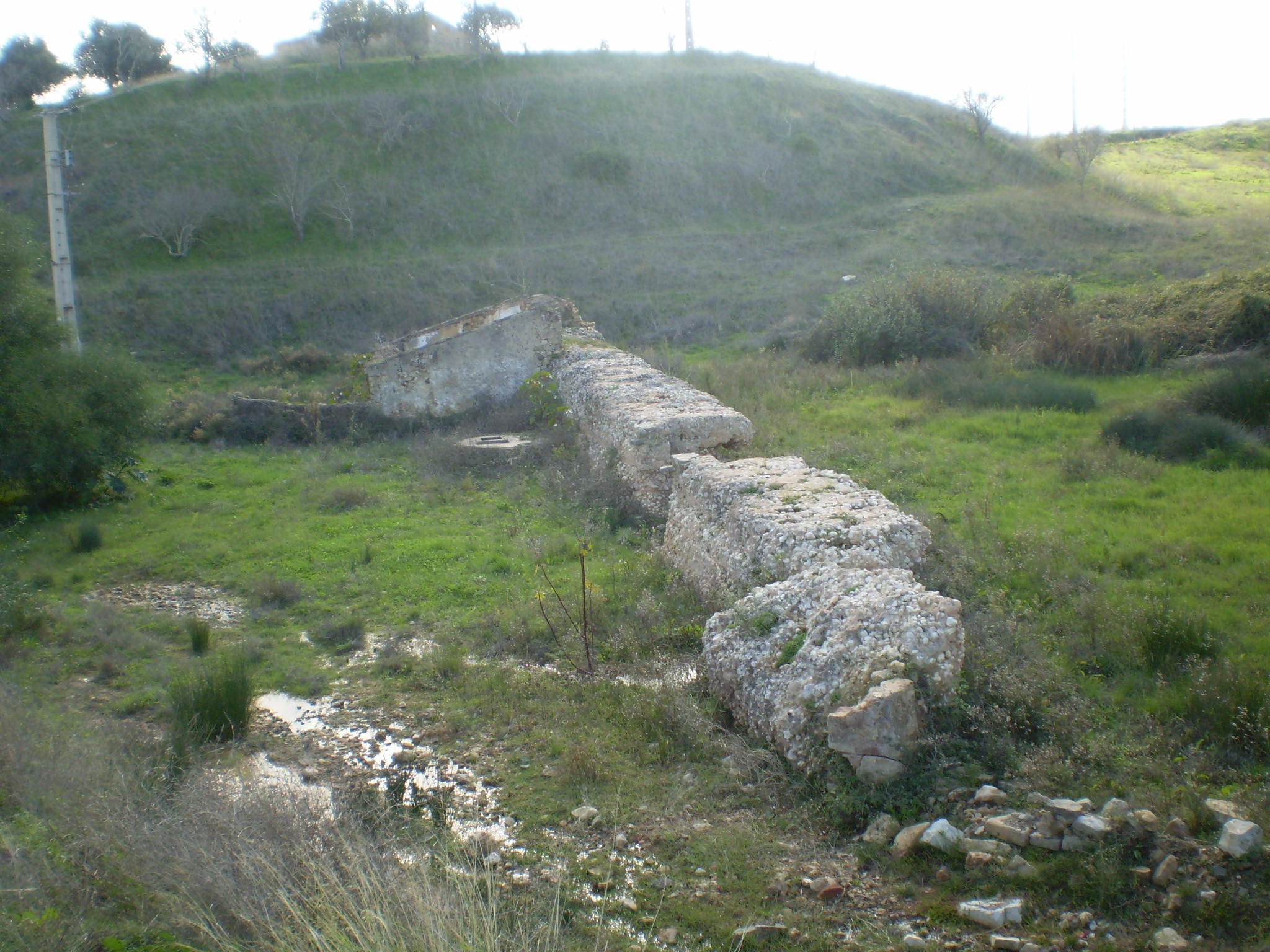
Remains of the Roman dam of Fonte Coberta, in Lagos.

== Roman Domain ==
Due to the Carthaginians' attempts to dominate the peninsula, the Celtiberian inhabitants called in support from the Romans. A series of conflicts between the Carthaginians and the Romans began, known as the Punic Wars, which also reached the peninsula. In 206 BC, the city of Gades (Cadiz) surrendered to Rome, thus ending the Second Punic War in the Iberian Peninsula, and Carthage's domination of the peninsula. However, after Carthage's surrender, the Roman civilization began a series of military campaigns to dominate the whole peninsula, which took about two hundred years. In 155 BC, the Lusitanian War began, which opposed the military power of Rome to the Lusitanian tribes. Resistance to the Roman armies was initially led by Viriathus, between 147 and 139. After Viriathus' death, most of Lusitania was conquered by the commander Decimus Junius Brutus Callaicus, including the city of Lacobriga. Viriathus was succeeded as head of the Lusitanian resistance by Quintus Sertorius, against Quintus Caecilius Metellus Pius and Gnaeus Pompey Magnus, from 80. In 76, Lacobriga was besieged by the Romans, commanded by the consul Quintus Caecilius Metellus, who hoped the city would surrender due to lack of water, since in its perimeter there was only one well. Sertorius reportedly gathered an army of two thousand horsemen from Lusitania and Africa, who broke the siege and distributed the water they brought to the besieged. According to historian Silva Lopes, who quotes Father Salgado and documents from the city council, Consul Metellus was embarrassed by the ease with which Sertorius' forces won the battle, so he withdrew to the Andalusian area. At that time, the city of Lacobriga was part of the territory controlled by Sertorius, and remained an important trading port. In 72, Sertorius was assassinated, although the conquest of the entire Iberian Peninsula did not end until 44.

Roman rule deeply marked the future Portuguese territory, and the city of Lacobriga was no exception, having established itself, during that time, as an important industrial pole, as can be proven by the presence, in 25 de Abril and Silva Lopes Streets, of vestiges of a complex that included salting plants, which were in use between the 2nd and 6th Centuries, and the dump of a Roman ceramics factory. The city had some influence in the region, and its administrative power may have encompassed the Roman settlement in the Abicada area of the Alvor River. Several traces of Roman civilization have been found around the city of Lagos, including silver coins and other metallic objects, and traces of buildings around the present city, especially in the area of Monte Molião. Roman coins have also been found in the ruins after the 1755 earthquake. During the Roman period, the name of the city was changed from Lacobriga to Lacobrica.

== Middle Age ==
The Middle Ages was a time of great transformation in the Iberian Peninsula, with the replacement of Roman rule by a Visigothic Kingdom, which in turn was almost totally destroyed during the Muslim invasions. This was followed by a long period of conflict in which the peninsula was fully reconquered by the forces of Christendom, with the formation of several independent kingdoms on the newly conquered land, divided by a mesh of small domains. One of these was the County of Portugal, which was the genesis of the nation of Portugal. All these phases were intensively reflected in the Algarve, a region that due to its geographical situation was one of the first to be hit by the Muslim invasion, and simultaneously the last to be reconquered in the Portuguese territory.

Map of the division of the Iberian Peninsula in 411.

=== Visigoth and Muslim Domain ===
The Roman domination of the Iberian Peninsula entered into decay in the 5th century, with the invasions of the Alans, Vandals and Suebi, who had made an agreement in 409 with Magnus Maximus, pretender of the imperial title, and in 411 they divide the peninsula among themselves with the agreement of the emperor Flavius Honorius, leaving Lusitania to the Alans. However, in 415 the Romans were forced to ask the Visigoths for help, due to the plundering by the Alans and Silingi Vandals. The Visigoths thus invade the peninsula, which they came to dominate completely after the fall of the last colonies of Byzantium in 624. In 622, Lagos was already a seat of a bishopric, since in that year its bishop attended a Toletan Council. Silva Lopes, quoting the historian Faria e Sousa, confirmed the presence of a bishop based in Lagos, and who had the name of Servo, while Father João Baptista Coelho stated that the bishop of Lagos, called Servo de Deus, had attended one of the councils of Toledo during Sisebert's term as archbishop of Toledo. Antonio Caetano da Costa Inglez, prior of the church of Santa Maria de Lagos, mentioned that according to several ancient authors, including the Spanish historian Ambrosio de Morales, the bishop of Lacobriga had been in the fourth, sixth and seventh councils of Toledo.

The Visigoth monarchy in the peninsula lasted about 300 years, until its extinction in the 8th century, due to the invasions of the Mohammedan peoples, who came from North Africa under the command of Tariq ibn Ziyad. The Muslim campaign began in 711, and in that very year they defeated the Visigoth forces in the decisive Battle of Guadalete. The Muslim invasion started very quickly, and in 713 they had already taken Seville, Mértola and other important cities, and the following year Evora, Santarém and Coimbra fell. Lagos was taken by the Umayyads in 716, being handed over to Abd ar-Rahman I, Emir of Córdoba. The settlement was thus renamed Halaq Al-Zawaia or Al-Zawaia, which, according to some authors, means "Muslim Monastery", lake or well. During Muslim rule, Lagos went into a deep decline, falling to the category of village. It is possible that Lagos Castle was built during Muslim rule.

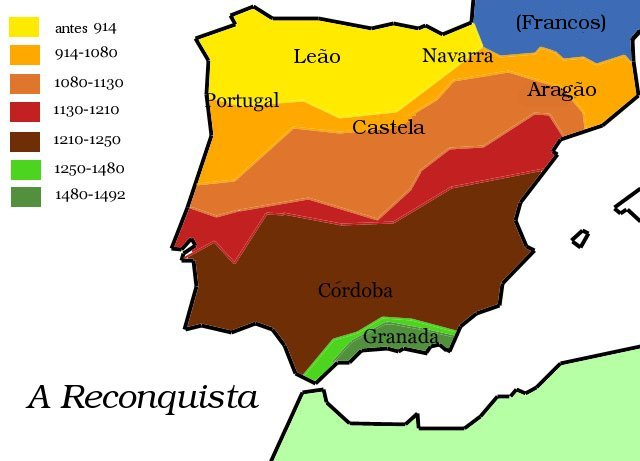
Stages of the reconquest of the Iberian Peninsula.

=== Reconquista and Portuguese independence ===
The Reconquista began soon after, with the decisive Christian victory at the Battle of Covadonga, although it progressed slowly, with several advances and retreats. Several campaigns were organized spaced in time, aimed at weakening Muslim rule, and liberating the territories controlled by the enemy. For instance, in 798 D. Afonso II of Asturias launched an incursion against Lisbon, and in 844, the Norman peoples made several expeditions in the Peninsula, attacking the cities of Lisbon and Beja, and the Algarve region. In the 1130s, Afonso Henriques started a campaign against the Muslims, which culminated in the Battle of Ourique in 1139. In 1140, Afonso Henriques proclaimed himself king, although this title was only confirmed by the Treaty of Zamora in 1143. The reconquest continued from north to south, with Lisbon being liberated in 1147, Évora in 1165, and Serpa in 1866. In 1189, D. Sancho I made a raid on the Algarve coast with the support of German and Danish crusaders, and conquered the castles of Alvor, Silves and Albufeira. Thus, Lagos was liberated, and was, according to some authors, donated by the king to the Bishop of Silves, Nicolau de Santa Maria, while others claim that it was given to a foreigner who had a reputation for a holy life. Meanwhile, in 1174 the Chapel of Saint John the Baptist was built, as indicated by a tombstone that existed near the door.

In 1190, the Bishop of Silves gave the church of Lagos to the Monastery of São Vicente de Fora, at the request of King D. Sancho, at which time it was considered only as a village. Lagos was reconquered in 1191 by the Emir of Seville, Abu Yusuf Yaqub al-Mansur.

King D. Sancho II liberated Aljustrel in 1234, Mértola in 1238, and Alvor in 1240, while his successor D. Afonso III reconquered the rest of the Algarve region in 1249, in a campaign led by Paio Peres Correia. The town of Lagos was taken between 1241 and 1249. The Muslims fled to Africa, having destroyed their buildings before, so as not to be taken advantage of by the Christians; However, the town did not remain uninhabited for long, as it was soon repopulated by fishermen, due to its fishing wealth and convenient location. With the final reconquest of the Algarve, the land battles ended, although the conflict continued at sea, as Muslims began attacking Christian vessels off the coast. A few years after the rebirth of Lagos, the town began to be attacked by forces coming from North Africa, who captured cattle and kidnapped people, to be sold as slaves. To protect the settlement, D. Afonso IV ordered the construction of walls around the town, which protected the area between the Porta da Vila, the future Church of Santo António, the Castle of Lagos and the Porta de São Gonçalo.

The Muslim civilization left deep traces in Lagos' culture, such as the use of the rebuço, which was used by Moorish women to cover their faces, and which was adopted by Christian inhabitants until its use was banned by the Civil Governor of the Algarve, Júlio Lourenço Pinto, in 1892.

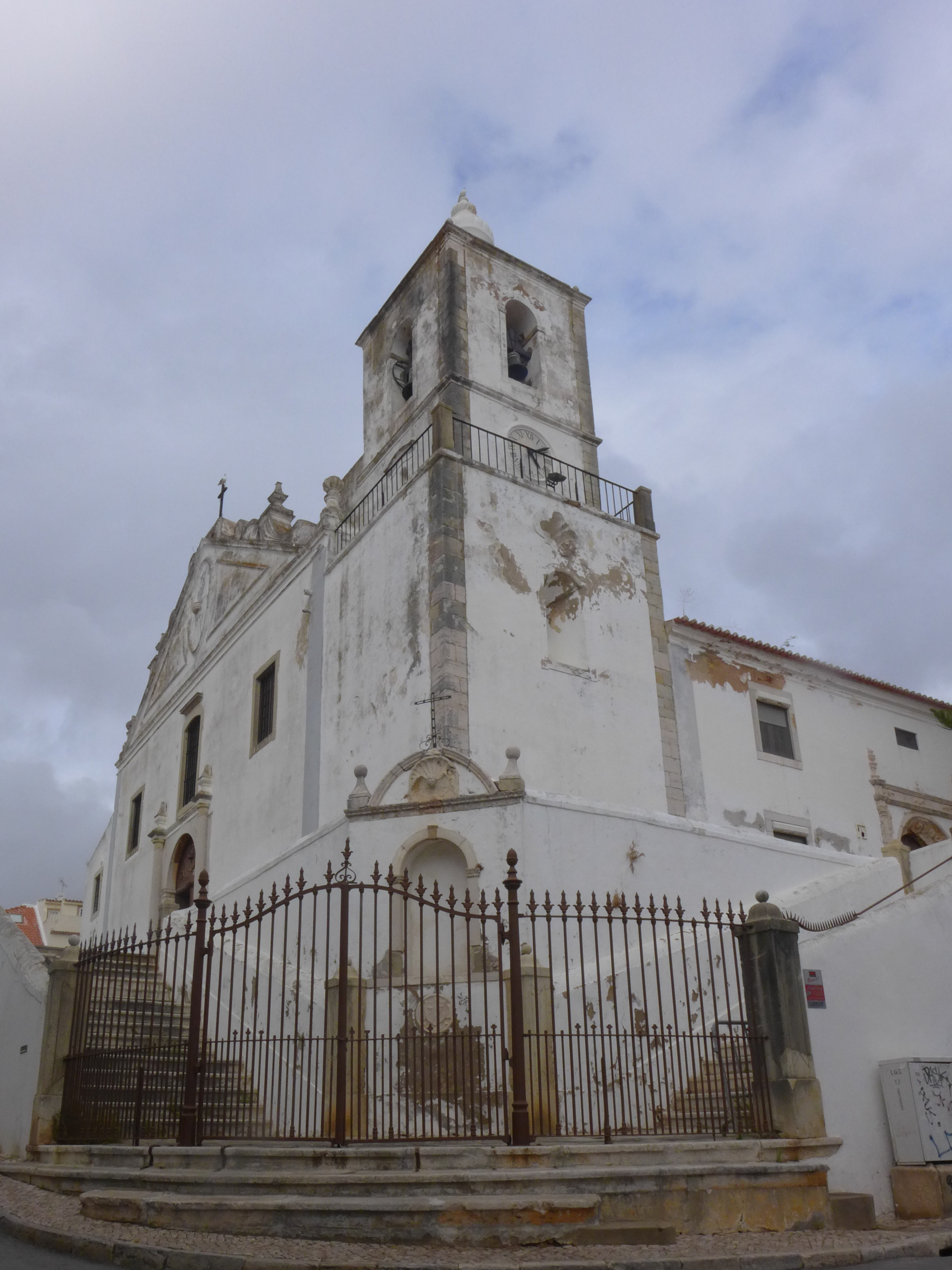
São Sebastião Church (Lagos)

=== From the Reconquista to the Age of Discovery ===
Shortly after the end of the Reconquista, King Afonso X of León and Castile, who considered he had a right to the Algarve because it had been donated to him by the emir Muça ibne Maomé ibne Nácer ibne Mafuz, invaded the region and conquered several villages, and appointed a new bishop for Silves, Roberto, to whom he donated the village of Lagos. Military service in Lagos began shortly after the end of the reconquest, and Lacobrigan troops were prominent in the Fernandine Wars and during the 1383–1385 Portuguese interregnum.

In the first half of the 14th century, a conflict took place opposing King Afonso IV to Afonso XI of Castile, during which a naval battle was fought near Cape Saint Vincent, where the Castilians were victorious.

After the end of the Reconquista, fishing activities were renewed in Lagos, which were several times encouraged by the Portuguese monarchs. For instance, a letter dated 22 December 1305 from D. Dinis authorized João de Menezes and Benanite to launch traps for tuna fishing. According to Silva Lopes, Sicilian immigrants started whaling in Luz during the reign of either D. Afonso III or D. Dinis. At the time of these monarchs, tuna and whale fishing and the capture of coral earned the king an income of 60 to 80 contos (about 1,000 to 2,000 dollars). A royal charter of 15 August 1360, issued by D. Pedro, gave several privileges to the inhabitants of Lagos, including the right to own defensive arms throughout the kingdom. In that year, several fishing traps were also authorized to foreigners. At that time, the village was called Lagus. São Gonçalo de Lagos was also reportedly born in 1360. On 30 November 1367, King D. Fernando ordered the almoxarife of Lagos to give a load of horse beast to the bishop and the chapter of the Silves Cathedral for every whale or mackerel that died on the coast. On 5 March 1372, King D. Fernando donated Lagos to Gregorio Premado or Termado, and later it became the property of Gonçalo Fernandes. According to historian José Formosinho, in 1378, the blessed São Gonçalo was born in the village of Lagos, and he died in 1422 in Torres Vedras.

According to the scroll "Antiguidades de Lagos e suas igrejas", in 1325 the Hermitage of Nossa Senhora da Conceição was built, which later became the São Sebastião Church, and in 1415 a church dedicated to Santa Maria da Graça was built. However, according to an old manuscript, there were texts engraved on stones in the nave of the church, which indicated that it was founded in 1378. The Santa Maria da Graça Church is said to have been the first one built in Lagos, while the second one, dedicated to Santa Maria, was built in the late 15th century.

On 4 May 1397, the Castilian admiral Diego Hurtado de Mendoza (admiral mayor of Castile) seized, off Lagos, several Portuguese galleys bringing flour from Genoa. About 400 sailors of the captured galleys were drowned on the orders of the admiral, who thereby avenged his father, Pedro González de Mendoza, killed in the Battle of Aljubarrota.

On 8 July 1410, King D. João I exempted the inhabitants from paying a sisa for commercial transactions with the Venetians coming to Lagos. During D. João I's reign, an incident occurred in Lagos that triggered a serious diplomatic crisis involving the Portuguese, English and Spanish nations, when a Castilian ship arrived in Lagos intending to do business, but the crew was mistreated by the British inhabitants of the town, who had already settled in great numbers. The king of Castile reported the affair to D. João I, demanding compensation for the losses, and the Portuguese monarch sent the emissary João Viegas to London to inform King Henry IV of this incident. The English king responded evasively, justifying himself with a lack of evidence, and promised the plaintiffs safe conduct to England to present their claims.

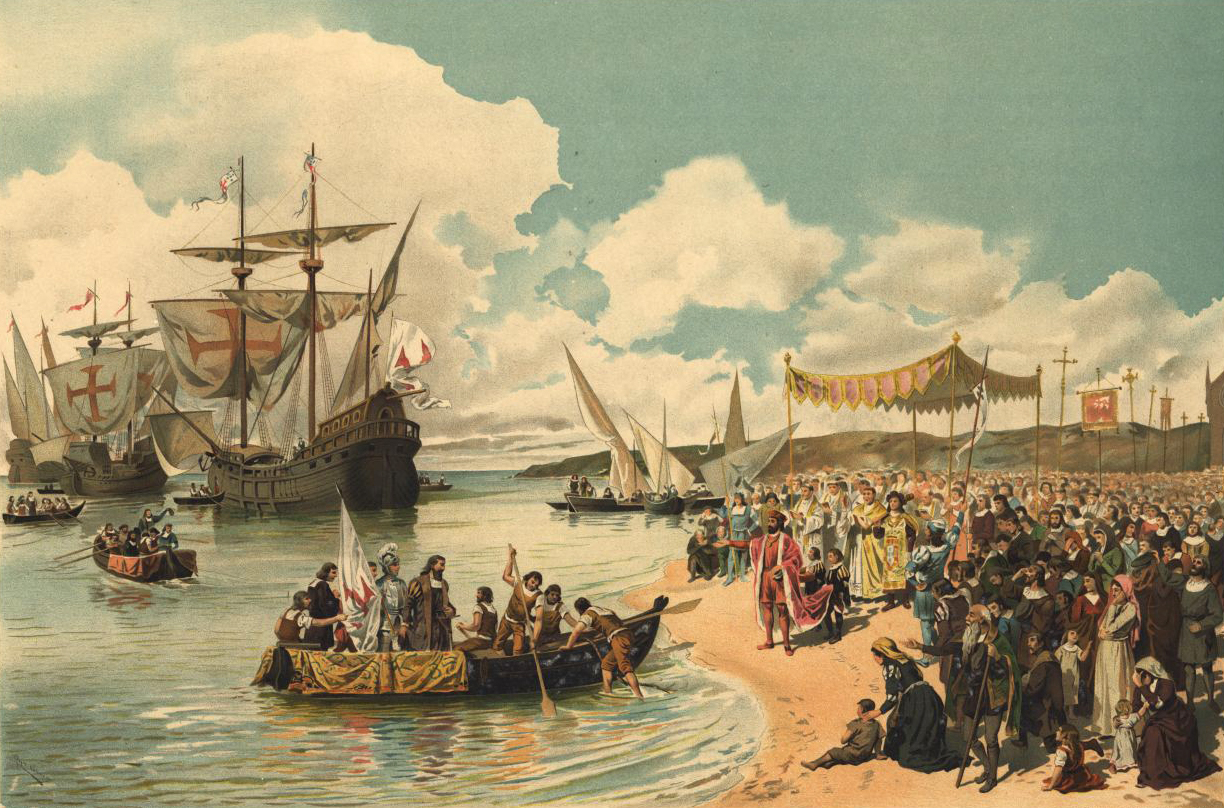
"Vasco da Gama's departure to India in 1497", painting by Roque Gameiro

During the reigns of D. Fernando and D. João I, the settlement inside the town was about 1500 to 2000 neighbors, from the higher social classes, while merchants, seafarers and other individuals of less noble origin lived in dwellings outside the walls, as they were forbidden to reside inside.

== Modern Age ==
In the 15th century, the great cycle of the Portuguese Discoveries began, which brought profound changes not only to Portuguese society but also to the whole world, by promoting contact between continents, cultures and civilizations. Also due to its privileged position, the Algarve played an important role in the early years of the Portuguese Discoveries. The peak of the Discoveries was reached with Vasco da Gama's arrival in India in 1498, and the beginning of the colonization of Brazil in 1500. However, the 16th century saw the loss of Portuguese independence, with the Philippine Domain, which lasted from 1580 to 1640, a phase that was however of great development for the Algarve region. The phase after the restoration of independence was marked by the large number of conflicts in which the country became involved, in defense of the metropolis and the colonies, which caused serious economic problems and the loss of large portions of overseas territory. Although the situation improved during the 18th century, this period was marked by the devastating 1755 earthquake.

=== Portuguese Age of Discovery ===
==== First phase (1415–1460) ====
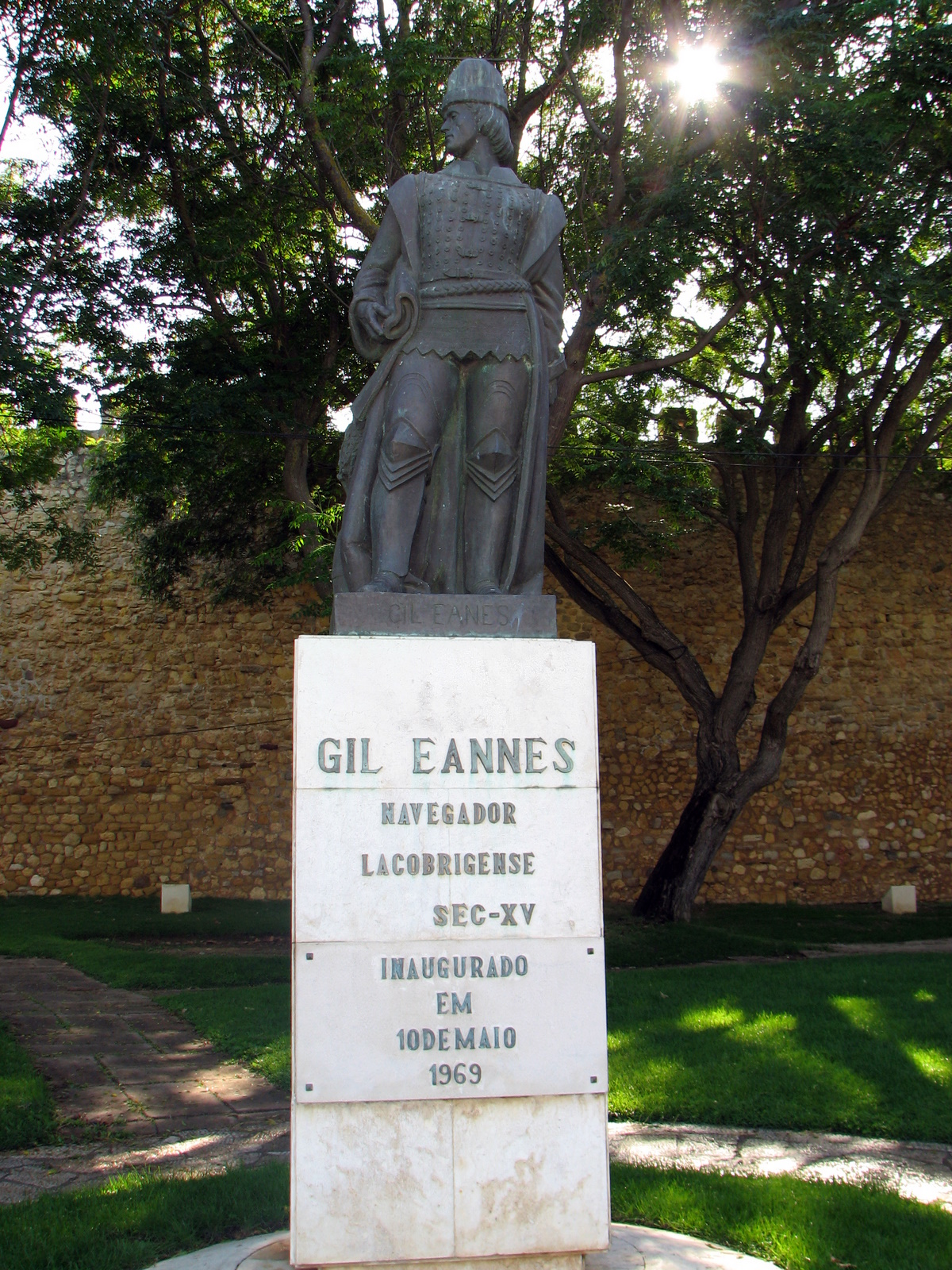
Statue of navigator Gil Eanes, in the Jardim da Constituição, in Lagos

The cycle of the Portuguese Discoveries started in the 15th century, with the first conquests during the reign of D. João I, encouraged by the Infantes D. Henrique, D. Pedro and D. Duarte, the latter being heir to the throne. The city of Lagos was one of the main ports during the Discoveries, and was the starting point for several naval expeditions in the 15th and 16th centuries. Indeed, it was part of the first military campaign against North Africa, which left Lisbon on 25 July 1415, to conquer the city of Ceuta. The armada, which was composed of more than 200 ships, reached Lagos the next day, where it stayed a few days. On the 28th, the king revealed the true destination of the expedition, and his preacher announced the bull of the Holy Crusade over all those who were part of the campaign. Then the armada left for Ceuta, where it arrived on 21 August. On the return, the king and Nuno Álvares Pereira landed in Lagos, from where they proceeded together to Évora.

In 1419, Prince D. Henrique left the court and settled in Sagres, Algarve, where he began his plans for Portugal's future overseas expansion. In that year, the island of Madeira was discovered, and some of the men accompanying João Gonçalves Zarco were from Lagos, notably Lourenço Gomes and António Gago. On his return, Zarco is said to have given news of the discovery to the Infante in Lagos, as described by Francisco de Paula Medina e Vasconcelos in his work "Zargueida". In 1422, a census was taken of the population of the Algarve, where it was found that there were 11,235 households, of which 5,325 were from Lagos.

Under the Infante's orders, the navigator Gil Eanes, born in Lagos, doubled Cape Bojador in 1434, a feat considered of great importance in the exploration of the African coast. On his return, the navigator gave Prince Henrique a barrel with earth and some flowers taken from the cape. In 1435, Gil Eanes, together with Afonso Gonçalves Baldaia, made another voyage along the African coast, having again passed Cape Bojador, and reached Angra dos Ruivos or Angra dos Cavalos, about 50 leagues south. Meanwhile, in 1430 D. João I exempted Lagos from various obligations to the army. On 25 September 1433, D. Duarte offered Infante D. Henrique the tuna fishing on the Algarve coasts, and in 1440 he authorized foreigners to exploit the tuna and sardine traps.

In 1441, already during the reign of King D. Afonso V, two expeditions to Africa were sent, one by Nuno Tristão to Cape Blanco, and another by Antão Gonçalves to the Golden River, having brought back to Lagos some of the first African slaves. Around 1444, Lançarote de Lagos, Prince Henrique's squire and the king's chamberlain in Lagos, formed the Companhia de Lagos, to carry out commercial operations along the African coast. That same year, the navigator organized a fleet of six caravels for an expedition to the Bay of Arguin, where hundreds of slaves were captured. These slaves were then shared on their return to Lagos, an operation that was attended by Prince Henrique, and described by Gomes Eanes de Zurara in his "Crónica da Guiné":

But what heart, no matter how hard it might be, could not be filled with pity at the sight of such a company? Some had their faces downcast and their faces flushed with tears, looking at each other; others were groaning pitifully, staring up at the heavens, keeping their eyes fixed on them, crying out loudly, as if to ask the Father of Nature for help; others were hurting their faces with their palms, throwing themselves down on the ground; others were lamenting in song, according to the custom of their land [...] But to make matters worse, those who had carried the burden of sharing came over and began to separate them one from the other, to put their shares on an equal footing; where it was necessary, they separated the children from the priests, and the wives from their husbands, and the brothers from one another. Friends and relatives were not subject to any law, but each one fell where fate took him!

According to the account, Prince Henrique was "on a powerful horse, accompanied by his people", and took the quinto that had been assigned to him, corresponding to "46 souls". In 1445 the Casa dos Tratos de Arguim starts operating in Lagos, the year the Arguin trading post was opened, the first Portuguese commercial establishment in the Black African area. Also in 1445, Lançarote de Lagos made another expedition from Lagos to the island of Tider, to fight the Muslim presence. On 17 October 1458, an armada, commanded by Afonso V and Prince Henrique the Navigator, left Lagos for the conquest of Ksar es-Seghir, in North Africa. A royal charter of 15 August 1460 renewed the right of the Lacobrigenses to bring defensive weapons. On 13 November of that year, the Infante died. It was in Lagos that the first establishment in Portugal for the sale of slaves existed, on the first floor of the main guard building.

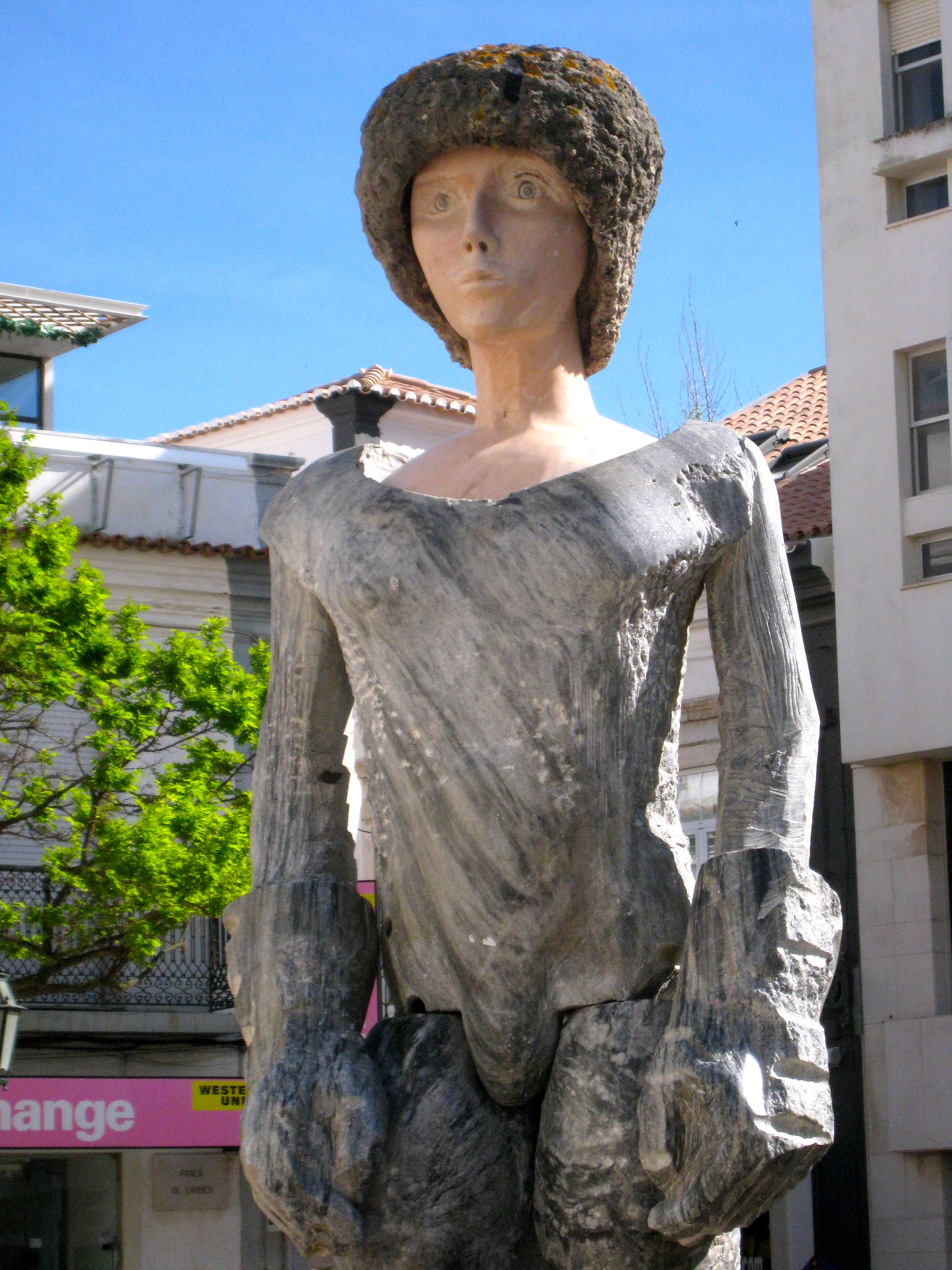
Statue of D. Sebastião in Lagos, by João Cutileiro.

==== Second phase (1461–1580) ====
In 1463, a royal charter moved the Feitoria do Trato de Arguim from Lagos to Lisbon. On 9 November of that year, another expedition commanded by D. Afonso V arrived in Lagos, participating in the unsuccessful attempt to conquer Tangier. A charter of 4 August 1464 donated the town to D. Fernando, nephew of Infante D. Henrique. Lagos was then passed to D. Diogo, who gave it to his sister Leonor as part of her marriage to the future D. João II. Diogo, who gave it to his sister Leonor as part of her dowry for her marriage to the future D. João II. Since then, Lagos has always belonged to the Portuguese crown. On 15 August 1472, King D. Afonso V passed through Lagos for the last time, together with D. João II, leading an expedition of 447 sails to conquer Arzila and Tangiers.

On 30 March 1477, King João II assured the Lagos inhabitants that their roots would not be taken away from them for the payment of their debts, which were to be made from deductions from their revenues. When the monarch passed by Lagos on his way to Alvor, he promised he would raise the town to the category of city, which he never did due to his death. On 30 September 1483, D. João II authorized the Duke of Trevento to carry out coral fishing all along the Algarve coast. At the 1490 Courts in Évora, the Lagos's procurator, Soeiro da Costa, complained against the owner Alvaro d'Athaynde, claiming that he had broken the agreement in which he was supposed to provide salt to Lagos in exchange for the exploitation of the salt lagoons of Alvor and the Salt House in Lagos, and that therefore the town had spent an important sum in the purchase of salt. In this way, he asked for permission to install salt pans in Lagos, which the king gave by a letter of 12 July of that year. When in 1497 the voyage to discover the sea route to India began, one of the ships of the fleet was named Bérrio, because it was acquired from a Lagos pilot of that name.

On 1 July 1504, King D. Manuel granted a charter to Lagos, and the monarch also modified the coat of arms. The former coat of arms consisted of a crowned shield, depicting a three-towered fortress bathed by the sea, flanked by spears on top. The charter gave important privileges to the inhabitants and merchants of Lagos, including the reduction and exemption of taxes on fishing and shipbuilding, regulated taxes on the purchase and sale of boats, and concentrated all salt trade in the crown, prohibiting private individuals from selling salt and opening salt pans. During the reign of D. Manuel, one of the donatory captains of Madeira Island, Simão Gonçalves da Câmara, was offended by the monarch and started a journey to Cadiz with the intention of settling there, but when he passed through Lagos he found that Arzila was in danger, so he gathered a small army to go to the rescue of the Portuguese square. The Portuguese army was not able to go to the rescue of the Portuguese square.

In 1507, D. Manuel determined that the Lagos squires that were arrested should be treated as knights. During his reign, the Lagos Maritime Compromise was created, originally called Brotherhood of Corpo Santo de Pescadores e Marítimos de Lagos. During D. Manuel's reign the town of Lagos was already well developed, with a large number of houses outside the walls, and the center of the town was Touros Square (future Infante Dom Henrique Square). Thus, the king ordered the construction of a new defensive circle, with four bastions by the sea, and eight on the land side. The town of Lagos was then left with eight gates, four on land and another four facing the sea. This work was part of a program by D. Manuel for the defense of the Algarve against Muslim onslaughts, which also included the construction of several fortresses, such as that of Burgau.

On 25 August 1535, D. Manuel's successor D. João III gave Lagos the title of notable, and granted it a seat on the third bench of the courts. The king also gave the town a charter on 14 January 1556, and ordered the construction of Lagos' walls and bastions to be completed. In 1573, King D. Sebastião elevated Lagos to the category of city, and made it the bishopric's seat and capital of the Algarve. Some historians have advanced that Lagos was elevated to a city in 1540, during the reign of D. João III, and that the bishopric's seat was only changed from Silves to Lagos in 1577. During D. João III's reign, the French captured several ships leaving Lagos, and even entered the bay and took two ships and a caravel, as described by a letter from the king dated 20 April 1552. In 1574, King D. Sebastião led an expedition to Africa in 1574, which passed through Lagos, although the king's route from Lisbon to this city has been disputed, with several historians stating that he had come along with the squadron from Cascais, while a manuscript from the convent of Nossa Senhora da Glória stated that he had traveled overland from Évora. The latter hypothesis was supported by the "Revista das Sciencias Militares", which published a chronicler João Cascão's account of the royal journey, preserved at the Torre do Tombo National Archive. On 20 August of that year, when the king was already in Lagos, he sent a letter to his aunt D. Isabel, and a circular addressed to the knights and the towns of the kingdom, where he reported his plans concerning Africa. On 24 June 1578 D. Sebastião again headed an expedition to Africa, which also stopped in the Bay of Lagos, where the king received the troops enlisted in the Algarve region. According to legend, when the monarch was in Lagos he visited the fortifications and prayed in the São Sebastião Church. During the reign of S. Sebastião, the position of Governor of the Arms of the Algarve was created, and was first held by Fernão Teles de Meneses.

During the reign of D. Sebastião, the first organized military force was created in Lagos as part of the Ordenanças system.

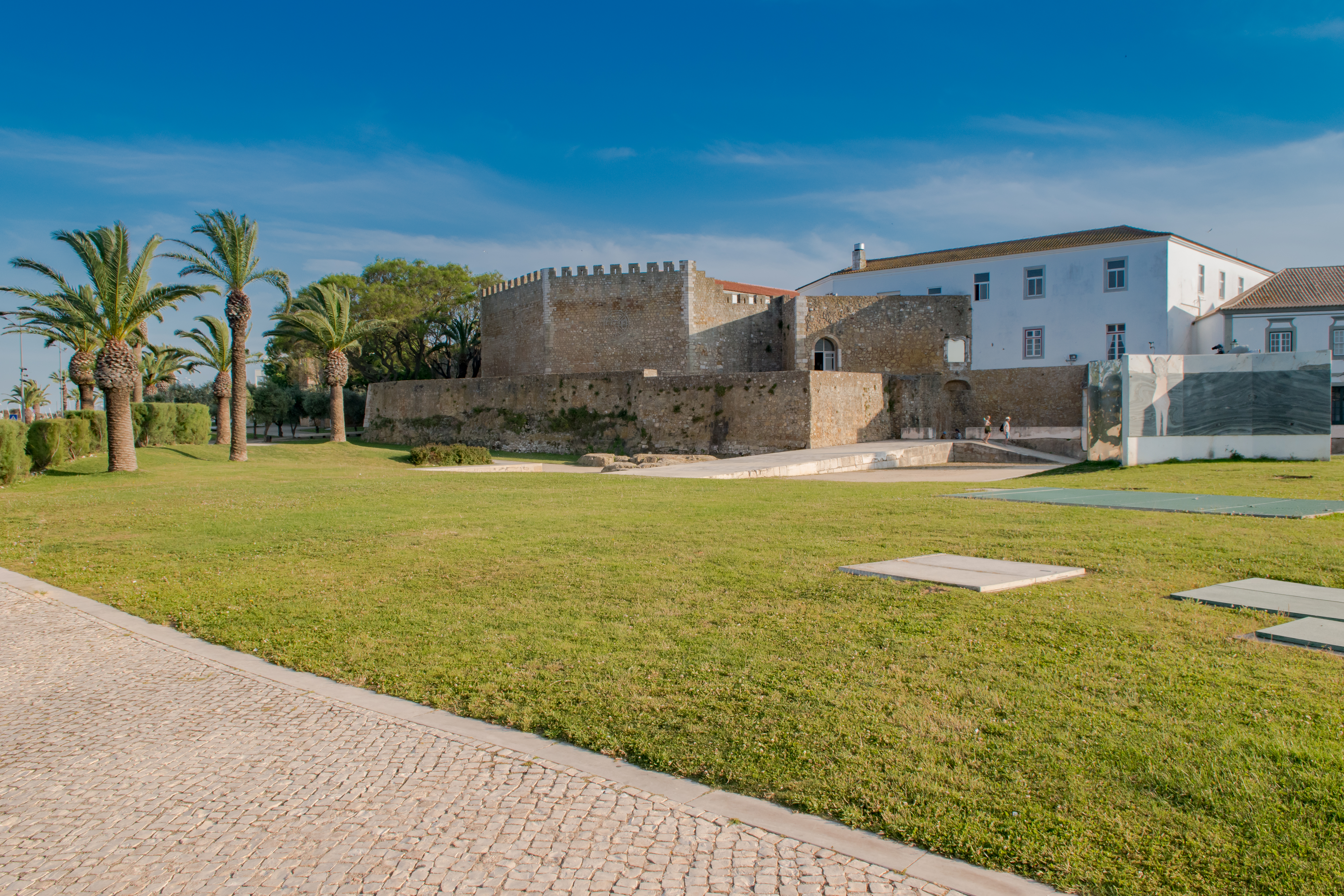
Governors Castle in Lagos.

=== Philippine Domain ===
In 1578, D. Sebastião disappeared in the Battle of Alcácer Quibir, and was succeeded by his uncle, Henrique I, who died in 1580. Thus, the throne passed to King Filipe II of Spain, thus causing the loss of Portuguese independence. However, this period was one of expansion for the city of Lagos, with the construction of a network of coastal fortifications, to defend the city from English privateers, who started attacking the region. The most important privateer was Francis Drake, who launched a campaign against the Algarve coast in 1587. On 25 May 1587, Francis Drake entered the bay of Lagos, where he landed a large army near the city walls, to plunder it. An Italian manuscript called "Ritrato et Riverso del Regno di Portogallo" gave a description of the country during the reign of Henrique I, between 1578 and 1580, in which Tavira, Lagos, Faro and Silves appeared as towns without a bishopric. The main ports in the Algarve were Lagos, Tavira and Vila Nova de Portimão. Silva Lopes mentions that King Filipe II of Spain confirmed, on 4 August 1581, several privileges that had been given to Lagos.

In a letter dated 8 December 1638, King Filipe III of Spain gave the city of Lagos the same benefits that his predecessor had granted to Coimbra.

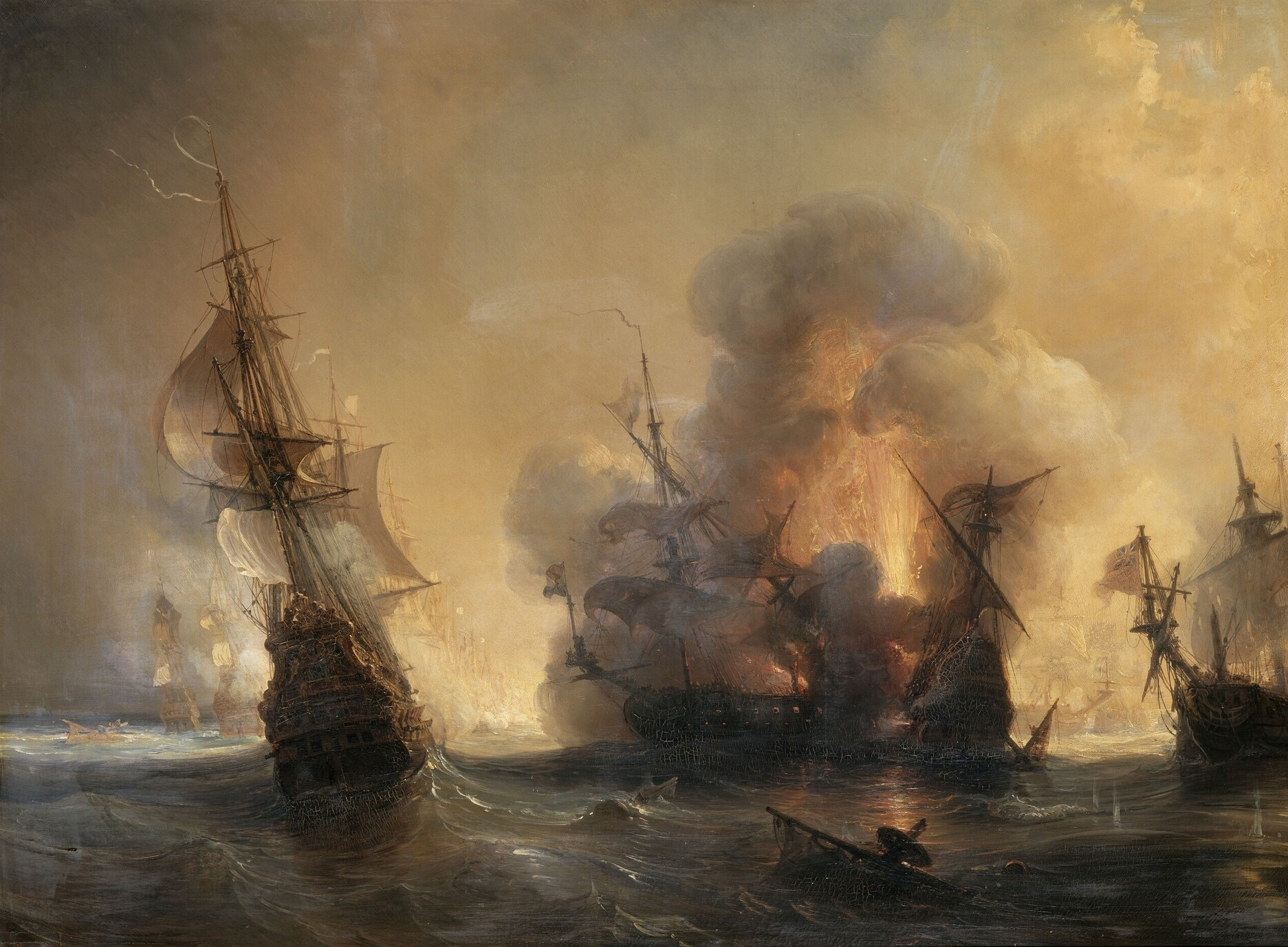
Painting of the Naval Battle of 1693, by Théodore Gudin.

=== Restoration of Independence ===
In the 17th century, a revolutionary movement against Castilian rule began, which succeeded in restoring Portugal's independence in 1640.

The period after the restoration of independence was one of decline for the town of Lagos, which was due to a drop in agricultural production, reduction in commercial activities due to a greater centralization in Lisbon, and a cholera epidemic that began in 1640. The greatest example of this concentration of trade in the capital was the creation of the Companhia Geral do Comércio do Brasil, which was based mainly on the Port of Lisbon, whereas previously the traffic to Brazil was done through several small ports along almost the entire coast, from Caminha to Lagos. Thus, these settlements lost a major source of income, generating criticism of the Brazil Company. During the reign of D. João IV, the Ordenança de Lagos was reorganized into a third, which participated in the battles for the Restoration of Independence. A royal letter of 16 September 1679 authorized the town of Lagos to send two procurators to the upcoming courts, which were scheduled for November of that year.

The first decades after independence were marked by the continuation of the process of reduction of Portuguese military and economic power in South America, Africa and the East to the Dutch, French and British, with the loss of some colonies. Internal problems also continued, with the Restoration War against Spain, which also hit the Algarve, financial crises that led to several currency devaluations, and several famine waves in 1647, 1659 and 1661. This decline continued in the first decades of the 18th century, with continued war with Spain and in the colonies, and a famine epidemic in December 1708, although there was an improvement in the financial situation, especially due to trade with Brazil. In 1691, the Casa da Vedoria or Main Guard House was built, according to a tombstone in the building itself, on top of the building that had been used for the sale of slaves. In 1706, military forces from Lagos fought in the War of the Spanish Succession.

The town was the scene of a naval battle in 1693, where the French defeated the British and Dutch fleets. In the late 17th century the Santo António Church is said to have been built, appearing in a 1691 tombo of the Misericórdia of Lagos.

In 1720, preventive measures were taken in the Algarve region against a cholera epidemic, which was spreading in southern Spain. During the reign of João V, the old terços were reformed into regiments.

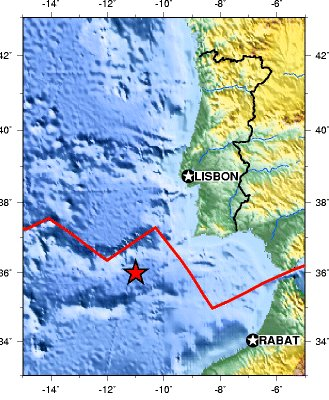
Epicenter of the 1755 Earthquake.

=== 1755 earthquake ===
From the late 1710s onwards, a period of violent earthquakes began, which hit the Algarve and other regions of the country. The first was on 6 March 1719, which destroyed a large number of buildings in Lagos, while another on 27 December 1722 also ruined several buildings and caused many deaths in the city, and created a tsunami. Then earthquakes occurred on 12 October 1724, 27 December 1732, 2 February 1734, 25 October 1739. This phase culminated with the 1 November 1755 earthquake and corresponding tsunami, which was considered the worst catastrophe of the century, and which devastated the city of Lisbon and many other towns in Portugal.

A description of the earthquake was given by a Lagos landowner:

November 1, 1755, by 9 o'clock in the morning, God was served to send a horrible earthquake with sea change, which in a few minutes flattened the city of Lagos and its walls, with the sea rising on our houses, which it flattened to the height of 13 palms and a half, taking all the valuable furniture, all the silver, gold, money, 28 barrels of wine, the wheat, corn and vegetables, my brother's bookshop, the scriptures of the farms that were in them and all the addresses of the houses we had in this city and on the riverside. And for not having a place to retire we made a tent in Santo Amaro, where we lived until we went to live in front of the fountain, where my brother died.

In a letter written on 7 February 1756, the prior of S. Sebastião, João Baptista Coelho de Castro, also described the earthquake itself and its effects:

on the first of November of last year, at nine thirty in the morning, the earthquake began, lasting four or five minutes, a little more or less, and was so strong in this city that totally destroyed it, except for some houses that were near the walls of the countryside, where it did not make much impression. All the temples were ruined, inside the walls as well as outside, so that it was impossible to officiate in them, and the church of Santa Maria was totally torn down, with only a wall left, and mine was all open with cracks; the rostrum and the tower fell, from the bars up and only the chapel of Santo Amaro remained in the countryside, and today my parish is in it, where I administer the sacraments [...] with a lot of work, because it is very small, and the parish of Santa Maria is in a house in the Praça d'Armas. Having ascertained the people who died, my parishioners, up to here I have only found that fivety or so died in the conflict, and I hope to find out better by the septuagesima when I take the parishioners' roll; however, it is certain that many more died in the parish of Santa Maria, and we have judged that in it there were 150 to 200 people; and according to the inclination of the buildings I assume that the earthquake started in the northern part, because I saw with my own eyes the destruction start in the part of my parish that is north and end in Santa Maria which is at noon; and after the earthquake, after a quarter of an hour, a little more or less, the sea rose so high that it seemed to touch the clouds, and at the cost of the sight everyone fled to the countryside and the damage it did was to bring down part of the walls that defended the sea, and with such violence that whole pieces of these walls, size of buildings, threw them inside the city, with whose momentum many houses were destroyed, as were those of Captain Simão Manoel de Villa Lobos and others in the square, taking what he found ahead, with boats and everything else, and put them on farms, very far from the sea and completely razed the chapel of S. Roque, which belonged to my parish. Roque, which belonged to my parish, in such a way that we don't know where it was, except for the place; he opened several mouths in the river that are still full of water in an empty sea and there is no bottom; at last this city and its outskirts were transformed in such a way, that it doesn't seem, even partially, what it was, and most of the inhabitants are living in this field in Santo Amaro, in huts, some of wood, others thatched, suffering a thousand inclemencies; almost all of them became very poor, because their moveable goods, some were buried in the ruins, broken, shattered and lost, others were taken by the mayor, and others (and these were the most) by thieves, because they understood that everything was common, and rebus sic identibus, it is impossible for it to subsist in this way without some repair. And after this earthquake there have been several repetitions, some major, some minor. From the cape of St. Vincent and its places I have the same fortune, and more than all the Bishop's Villa that remained a pile of stones and earth.

The earthquake itself claimed more than 200 lives and injured a great number of people, many of whom would die shortly afterwards. Before the earthquake, the census showed that Lagos had 3,000 communal people and 900 fires. In the aftermath of the earthquake, one of the most prominent figures was the Lagos district governor, Antão Bravo de Sousa Castello, who ordered the rescue of those who had been buried, the treatment of the wounded and the burial of the dead, and ordered supplies from abroad. On 7 February 1756, the city council sent a representation to the government, reporting that all structures in Lagos had been destroyed, and asked that the bridge be rebuilt, to facilitate the arrival of supplies, and to allow the passage of troops, in case Muslim forces launched an invasion at Meia Praia, as they had tried the year before. The council instituted several measures to minimize the effects of the earthquake, such as prohibiting the export of livestock, controlling prices of building materials and food, and fixing the wages of laborers. In addition to the town of Lagos itself, the town of Bensafrim was also totally devastated in the municipality. Besides destroying most of the buildings, the earthquake also caused a large earth movement that accentuated the silting of the Molião River (future Bensafrim River), while the large number of deaths worsened the health and hygiene conditions of the town. In addition, it also destroyed the fishing boats, causing an economic crisis. Thus, the city was no longer able to house the administrative and commercial powers, which were relocated to Faro. The process of reconstruction and economic recovery took more than half a century, although the commercial, military and administrative power of Lagos that had been gained during the Discoveries phase was irretrievably lost.

In the months after the 1755 earthquake, several aftershocks were felt, lasting until about 14 August 1756, with the most violet ones being 14 December 1755 and 14 August 1756. In addition to the aftershocks, there were also some cyclones, which did great damage, and rumbles were heard coming from the ocean.

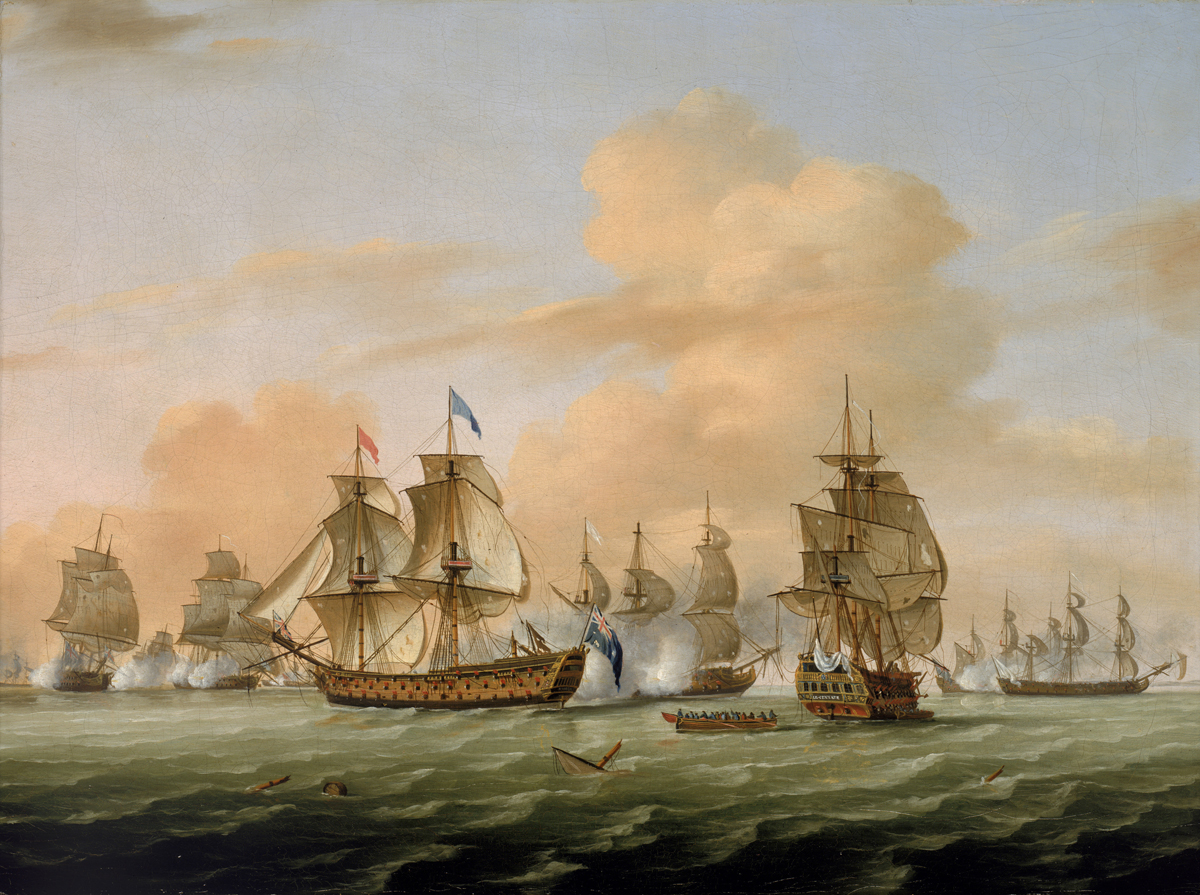
Battle of Lagos, in 1759.

=== Phase after the 1755 earthquake ===
In 1759 another naval battle occurred, which resulted in the victory of the British over the French. The French survivors landed on the beaches. The Marquis of Pombal complained about this battle in several letters sent to the Count of Chatham, considering it a violation of Portuguese sovereignty. In 1769, the Santo António Church was rebuilt, by commander Hugo Beaty, colonel of the Lagos Regiment.

Between 28 and 30 September 1783, the beatification of S. Gonçalo was celebrated in the city, a ceremony attended by the governor of the Kingdom of the Algarve, the Count of Resende and several priests from the region.

The Lagos Regiment fought during the Seven Years' War, between 1756 and 1763, and was part of the Rossilhão Campaign in 1795 and the War of the Oranges in 1801, where it distinguished itself in the battle of the Guadiana, where the defenders prevented the Spanish forces from crossing the river.

In the late 18th century coral was still being fished in Lagos, as can be proven by a record in the book of orders of the Lagos Plaza from 1781 to 1800, which ordered that aid be given to fishermen who made the capture of coral.

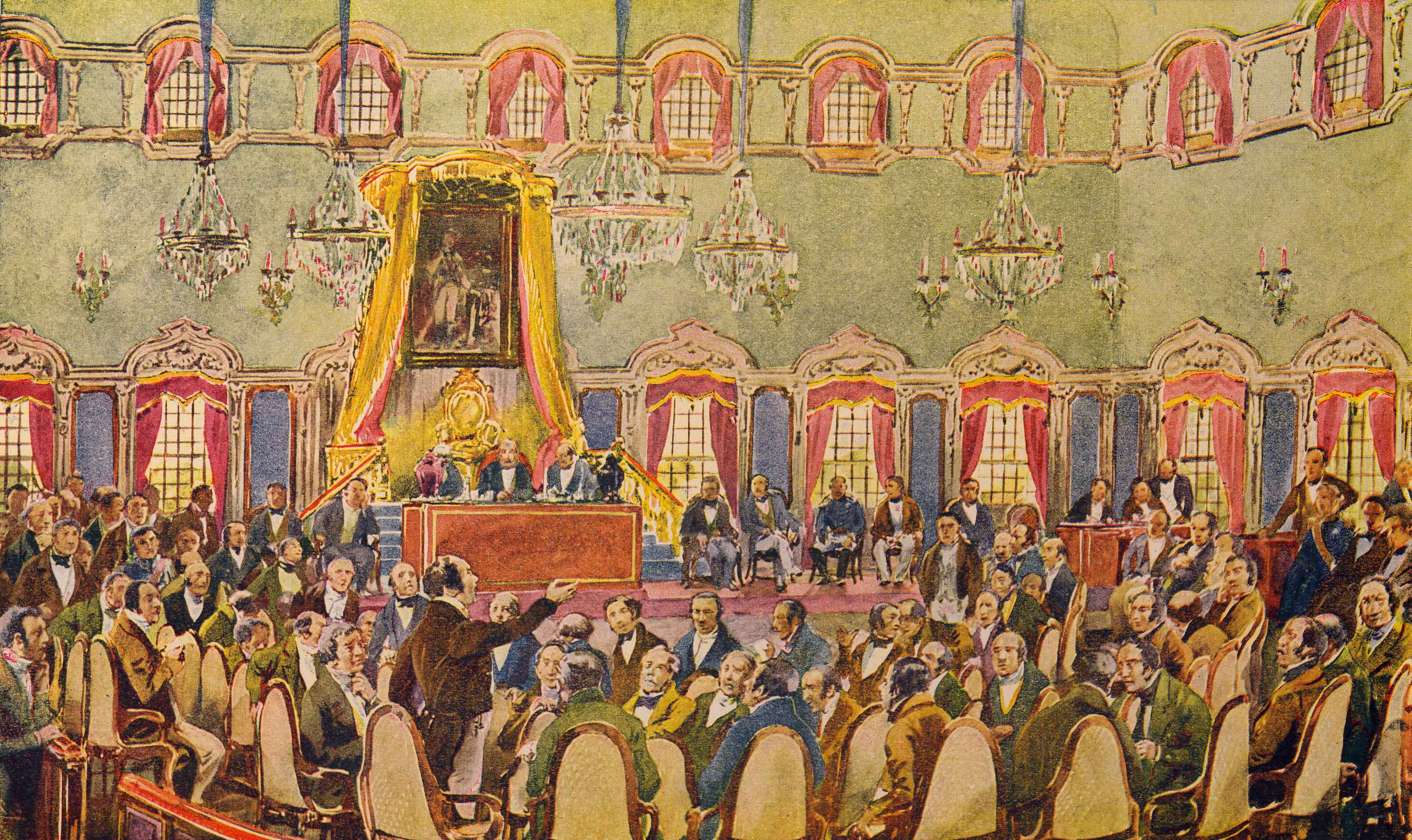
"The Constituent Courts of 1820", by Roque Gameiro.

== Contemporary history ==
The 19th century brought profound changes to the economic, political and social fabric throughout Europe, due in large part to the effects of the French Revolution. In Portugal, the early years were marked by a series of successive conflicts, first with the French Invasions and then with various internal confrontations, which culminated with the establishment of a liberal government, replacing the absolute monarchy. From the 1850's onwards a phase of political harmony began which allowed for great economic and social development of the country, although this stability began to deteriorate from the 1870's onwards, culminating in the implantation of the Portuguese Republic in 1910. However, the first years of the republic were marked by great political instability and social conflict, problems that were exacerbated by World War I, and ended with its replacement by a military dictatorship after the Coup of 28 May 1926. The country was controlled by an authoritarian regime for about 48 years, until it was overthrown by the Revolution of 25 April 1974, which reinstated a democratic government. The various measures instituted after the 1974 Revolution had profound effects on the Portuguese economy and society, with the extinction of the former colonies, return of civil liberties and the introduction of new ideas, and the country's integration into the European Economic Community.

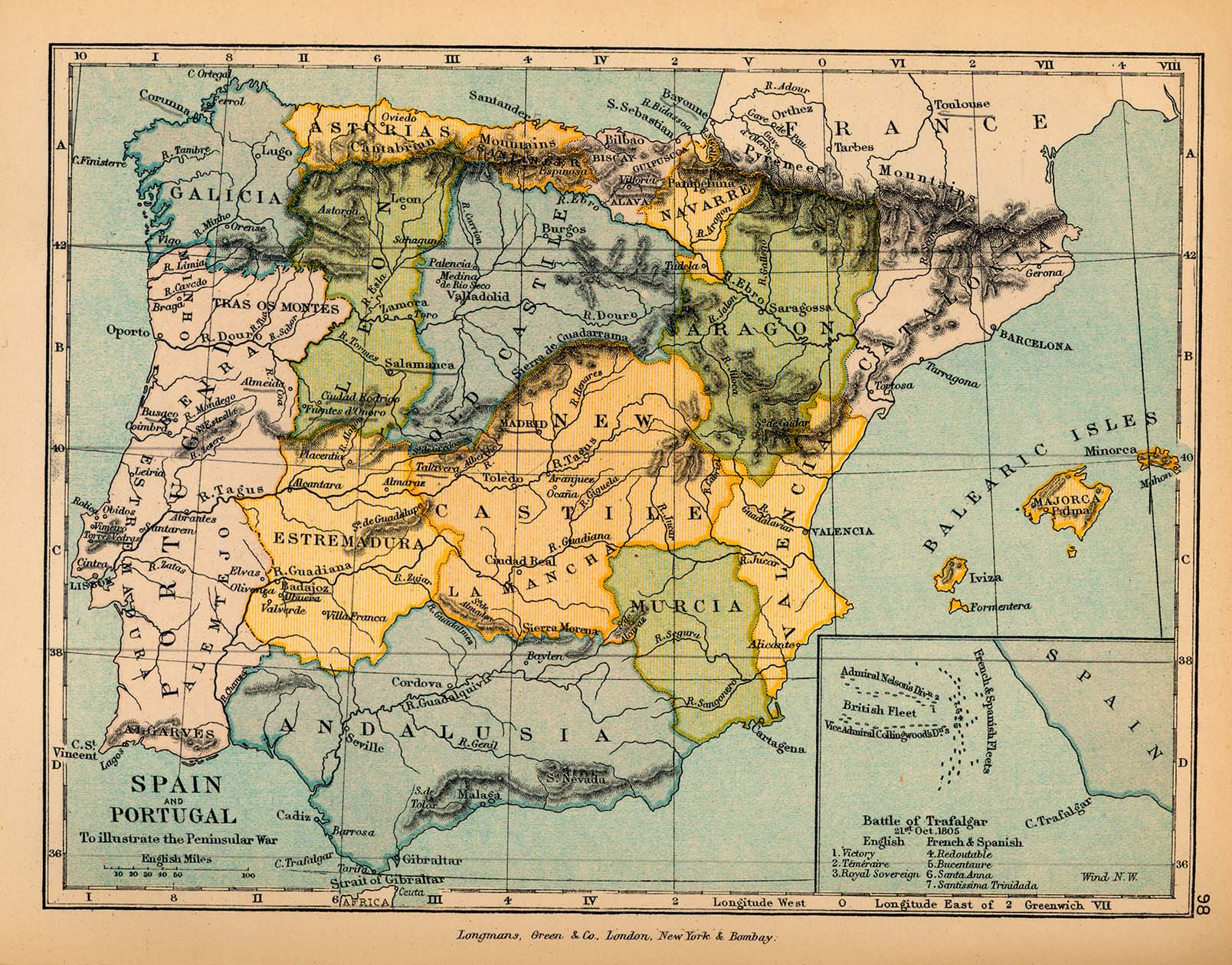
Map of the Iberian Peninsula, during the Peninsular War.

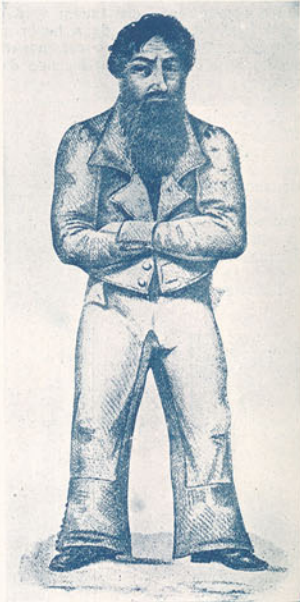
Portrait of the Miguelista commander José Joaquim de Sousa Reis, better known as Remexido.

=== French Invasions and Civil War ===
In the early 19th century, the country maintained a squadron operating in the Strait of Gibraltar, to protect the merchant navy against North African privateers, and which had its operational base in Lagos. At that time, the Algarve region was still sometimes attacked by pirates, including one case on 30 September 1802, when the maritime authorities in Lagos alerted the masters of the vessels that a 16-cannon Algerian frigate was prowling around the area, and another on 25 May 1805, when a Muslim xebec and a frigate captured two boats from Olhão in the middle of Lagos Bay. On 22 February 1801, the governor of the Lagos Square reported that the frigate Carlota had trapped a French schooner, whose crew had been taken to Lagos.

In 1807, the French Invasions began, which ended in 1810. The first French invasion ended with the Royal Family's escape to Brazil on 27 November 1807, leaving instructions that the French and Spanish troops should be welcomed. Following this order, on 16 December the Lagos City Council ordered several military facilities and private dwellings, to prepare them to host the Napoleonic troops, and ordered the inhabitants to lend their linen and other fabrics to the troops. Still, there were problems in finding enough space to quarter the foreign troops, due in part to the resistance of the owners to cede their houses, so on 24 January 1808 the municipality decided that the soldiers without a place to quarter should be installed in houses already inhabited, and be well treated by the residents. In early 1808, a large part of the Spanish troops had to be sent to respond to rebellions in Spain, so the commander Jean-Andoche Junot was forced to change the disposition of his forces to maintain dominance of Portugal. The Algarve region came under the command of General Antoine Maurin, who set up his headquarters in Faro, distributing control of the various towns in the region to his subordinates. The main one was Jean-Pierre Maransin, who settled in Lagos, as governor of the city. He came accompanied by the French regiment called the Meio-Dia Legion, which was quartered in the buildings of the Artillery Train. Maransin twice changed his residence in Lagos, because he wanted to be installed in a place where he was well supported, and for that purpose he occupied the house of the Captain Major, a wealthy man with liberal tendencies, who, for reasons of honor, never introduced his wife and daughters to him. Maransin was greatly offended by this gesture, so he repeatedly reviled the Captain Major in public, and ordered the servants to destroy his house and contents, and to seize the finest clothes as kitchen towels. One of Maransin's confidants, Captain Filippon, discovered that the Lagos corregedor, Joaquim Nicolau Mascarenhas Cordovil, was a friend of three ministers of the English court in Lisbon, and threatened him that he would denounce him to the general if he did not give him a large sum of money. This conduct was customary among French officers and troops in Portugal, who carried out several acts of violence and looting, which provoked resentment from the authorities and the populations. In Lagos some leaflets against the French occupation were produced, which incited the troops and the populations to revolt.

Indeed, resentment against the French was the catalyst for a major revolt in Olhão, which began on 16 June, and soon spread to other parts of the region, with the city of Faro being taken on the 19th. The next day, a meeting was held where it was decided to inform the remaining towns in the region of the success of the revolt, and Sebastião Duarte da Ponte Negrão was assigned as messenger for the Barlavento area, who ran all the way from Faro to Lagos in just 48 hours. Due to the fatigue of the journey, he was unable to continue beyond Lagos, and instead sent emissaries as far as the west coast, and then returned to Faro. When the inhabitants of Lagos heard of the revolt in Olhão, they murdered the French soldiers, whose bodies were thrown into the water at Barroca Street and Ponta da Piedade, or buried in the houses where they had been killed, an event of such brutality that it has been part of Lagos' oral history for generations. The surviving French troops took refuge in the Artillery Train, and then fled the city with their booty, which included the filling of the Santo António Church. In addition to the costs of supporting the French troops and the looting, the city of Lagos also suffered from the economic effects of the Peninsular War, mainly due to the increase in the prices of foodstuffs, and the decreased demand for fish in the Algarve, due to the armies moving northward.

Subsequently, infantry corps were formed at various points in the Algarve, including that of Lagos, which was one of those deployed to rescue the city of Beja and continue the revolution in the Alentejo region, being part of the army of the South, which despite its small size played an important role during the expulsion of the French. In 1808, the desembargador Belchior da Costa left Lagos in a caíque to meet Commander Wellington at the mouth of the Mondego River, and returned to Lagos in the English frigate Bullark, with some armament. After the defeat of the French that year, the prince regent, a refugee in Brazil, ordered the formation of a new squadron to fight the Algerian pirates, which was also to be based in Lagos.

In 1828, the Liberal Wars began, opposing the supporters of the absolutist king D. Miguel to the constitutionalist liberals, and lasted until the Evoramonte Convention on 26 May 1834. In July 1833, a naval battle took place near Lagos, where the liberals defeated the Miguelists. However, in 1836 the Miguelist commander José Joaquim de Sousa Reis, better known as Remexido, began a series of guerrilla campaigns against various points in the Algarve, including Lagos, which was several times attacked and surrounded. José Joaquim de Sousa Reis was shot in 1838.

On 28 May 1846, the governor of Lagos warned the town council that a revolution had broken out in São Bartolomeu de Messines, so the town walls should be repaired. That year, José Joaquim Grande was hanged in Lagos, and it was the last application of the death penalty in Portugal.

In 1850, the town council ordered the construction of a market for the sale of fish, in Porta de Portugal Street. That year, the Holy House of Mercy of Lagos was allowed to expand its hospital on the grounds of the former palace of the captains general of the Algarve, which had been destroyed in 1755.

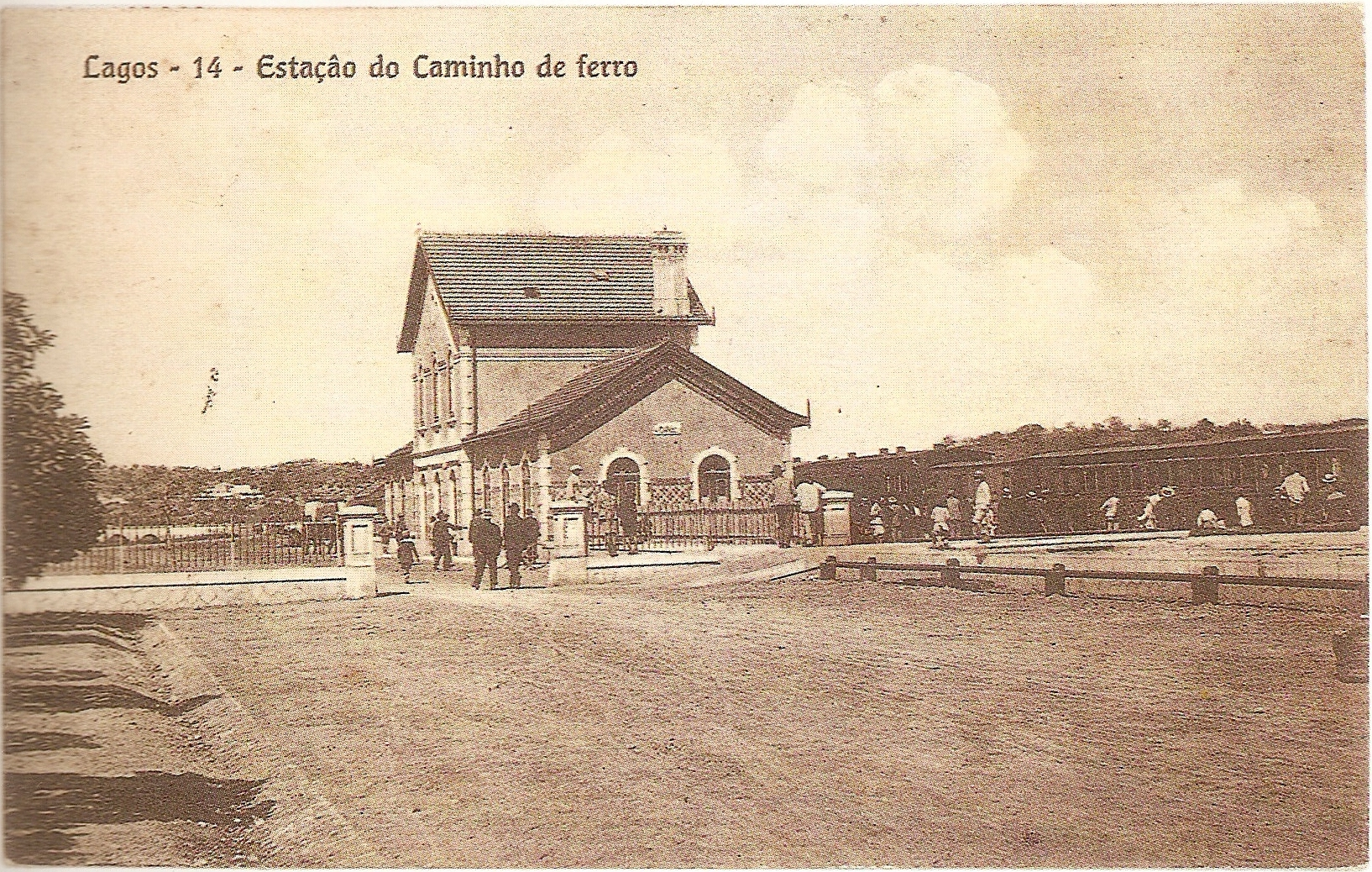
Postcard with the Lagos station, in the early years.

=== From regeneration to World War II ===
Since the mid-nineteenth century and until about 1960, Lagos was a city dominated by industry, due to the fact that the city has a large labor force, a direct connection to the interior of the Algarve, where raw materials and workers came from, and a port for the flow of products. Among the industrial activities, the one that had more impact was undoubtedly the canned food, due to the fact that the city had a fish industry in full activity. The first cannery in Lagos was F. Delory, which was established in 1882. Along with the canneries, several factories were also established that made support products, such as cans, keys to open the cans, wicker baskets, fishing tackle, olive oil, wooden boxes, among others. The industry reached its peak in 1920, with 32 companies operating in Lagos that year.

In 1862, work began on the Gil Vicente Theatre. In 1863, the Ministry of War authorized the Lagos municipality to widen the gates of the Quatros and of Portugal. On 3 June of that year, the Porta Nova bulwark was given to the city council, to be demolished and a fountain built on its site. On 11 July 1878, the municipality authorized the construction of an inspection post at the Meia Praia Fort. In 1888, the municipality was authorized to widen four more gates, namely those of Postigo, Vila, Cais and Porta Nova. In 1893, the government ordered studies to be carried out to build a wall to defend the walls of Lagos from the effects of the ocean.

On 12 October 1897, King D. Carlos arrived in Lagos by boat, accompanied by his wife Amélia de Orleães. The ceremony began with the arrival of the escaleres bringing the royal couple and the other guests, which passed through the middle of two wings formed by hundreds of boats decorated for the purpose, and where a large crowd of people launched firecrackers and greeted the kings. The city of Lagos was also decorated for this visit, with ornaments in every street from Constituição Square to Porta de Portugal Street, while quilts hung from the windows. The royal couple disembarked at Constituição Square and proceeded to the Santa Maria Church, then proceeded to the Paços do Concelho, where a speech was heard by the mayor and a meal was taken. During the ceremony, the royal couple laid the first stone for the construction of the wall, although the work never got underway. In 1902, the government ordered repairs to be made to the walls between Ribeira and Porta de Portugal, after many complaints by the municipality.

In the transition to the 20th century, the bay of Lagos continued to be regularly used by a large number of merchant and military vessels, and was several times one of the bases of operations of the British Navy. In August 1903, a British squadron made maneuvers in the bay, in the presence of the royal family and the Minister of Public Works, Count of Paçô-Vieira. Afterwards, part of the squadron went to Lisbon to thank the Portuguese government for permission to have maneuvers in Lagos, and Vice Admiral Arthur Wilson stated during a speech that "the bay of Lagos is an ideal point as a base for the maneuvers that were planned: but it is not only in this technical aspect that Lagos Bay was so useful: there we found ourselves surrounded by the warm hearts of an allied people, with a bright sun on our heads and received with such kindness and courtesies that we felt as in our own homeland". In 1904, the city council installed a new market for fish in Porta de Portugal Street, and the old building was provisionally destined for the sale of fruits and vegetables.

The intensive need for labor for the industries caused a rural exodus in the county. Besides the economic rejuvenation, there were also developments in transportation, with the construction of the National Road 125 and the railway station, the latter inaugurated on 30 July 1922. In 1927, the electric power grid was inaugurated in Lagos county.

Meanwhile, on 5 October 1910, a revolution took place in Lisbon, which overthrew the monarchic regime and established the Portuguese Republic. It was in this period that the first tourist activities began in the town, and for example in 1913 a leaflet was published by the Portuguese Propaganda Society, announcing the construction of the Lagos Palace Hotel, which, however, would not be built, despite the support of the Lagos Municipality. Rail transport allowed tourists to arrive in the town, and the first accommodation units were established, in private houses and on camping sites.

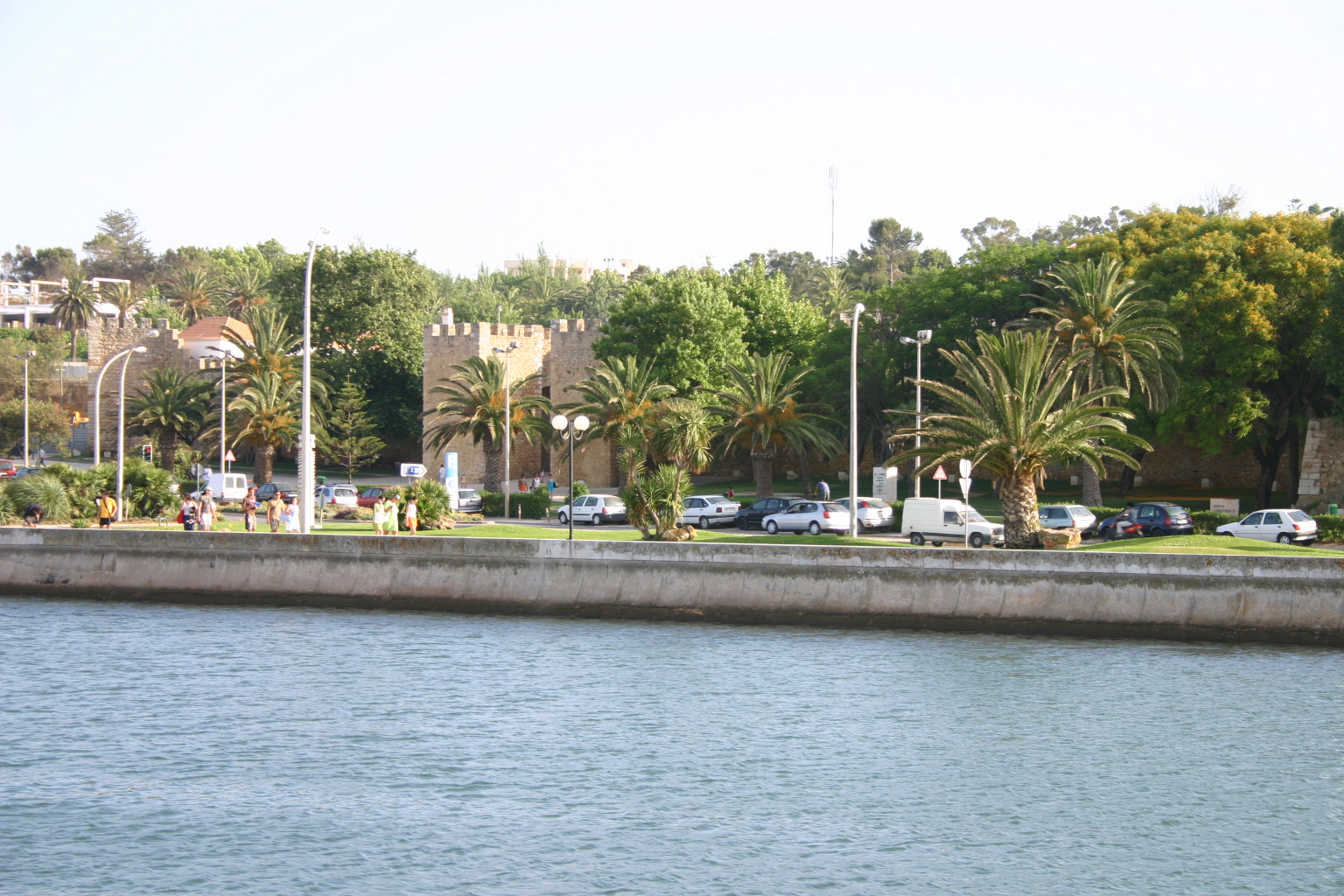
Section of Descobrimentos Avenue, with the Constituição Garden in the background.

=== Postwar and the 21st century ===
After the World War II (1939–1945), competition from foreign products, the relocation of industries to North Africa, the silting up of the port of Lagos and the decrease in fish production, raw material for the canning industry, caused the decline of this activity, and other industries that depended on it. This led to an economic and social decadence, which would only be reversed in the 1980's and 1990's with the development of tourism in the city. Although tourism had been known in the city since the beginning of the 20th century, it was with the inauguration of Faro Airport in 1965 that there was an increase in the number of visitors. This trend towards tourist activities was found almost everywhere along the Algarve coast.

The city also saw the construction of the Descobrimentos Avenue and the restoration of the Ponta da Bandeira Fort, among other heritage and urban developments in the 1950s and 1960s, with an increase in tourism activities in the city already being predicted. On 28 February, 1969, there was an earthquake of high intensity, causing extensive material damage in the region. The old building of the Lagos City Hall was badly hit, and repairs took place in 1982. On 25 April 1974, the Carnation Revolution takes place, which extinguished the Estado Novo and restored a democratic regime in Portugal.

On 10 October 1984, the Diário de Lisboa reported that an agreement had been signed between the Ministry of Social Equipment and the Lagos Municipality for an extensive urban rehabilitation program in the historic city center, which included work on the sewage and water supply networks, which in some places were already over fifty years old, the installation of Portuguese-style sidewalks in the streets and their partial prohibition to automobile circulation, expansion of public lighting, the construction of an amphitheater inside one of the corners of the walls, the reuse of the Slave Market for an art gallery and the building of the Society of the Rich for a cultural center, and the expansion of the Municipal Museum. At that time the municipality had already prepared the urbanization plan for Meia Praia and the surrounding area, which had been under consideration by the Directorate-General of Urban Planning for about five years. Also the Directorate General of National Monuments was carrying out or planning works in several monuments of the city, having already started the recovery of the walls and turrets and the area of the Governors' Castle, which was in an advanced state of degradation, and the beginning of conservation works in the Santo António Church was expected soon.

In the last decades of the 20th century and early 21st century the city experienced a major expansion, and new residential neighborhoods and commercial, health, education and sports and administration facilities were built. Noteworthy are the buildings of the Paços do Concelho Século XXI, inaugurated in 2009, and the EB 2,3 Tecnopolis de Lagos School, which became operational in 2010.

Construction of Marina de Lagos and the corresponding housing and commercial area, which included a hotel unit, was carried out. There has also been a growth in activities aimed at tourists, such as guided tours both in boats along the coastline and by land vehicles. There was also a large increase in the hotel industry, with some larger units being built, although most of the new supply was created in the form of residential tourism, through the use of small buildings with a small number of rooms.

== See also ==
- History of Portugal
- Portuguese discovery of the sea route to India
- Portuguese maritime exploration
- Battle of Covadonga
- War of the Oranges
- Portuguese Restoration War
- Lusitanian War
- Peninsular War
- Seven Years' War
- Fernandine Wars
- Portuguese Restoration War
- Battle of Guadalete
- Battle of Lagos
- Battle of Aljubarrota
- 1383–1385 Portuguese interregnum
- 1969 Portugal earthquake
- 1755 Lisbon earthquake
- Carnation Revolution
- 5 October 1910 revolution
- 28 May 1926 coup d'état
- Ditadura Nacional

== Bibliography ==
- Arruda, Ana Margarida (2007). Laccobriga: a ocupação romana na baía de Lagos. Lagos: Câmara Municipal de Lagos. ISBN 978-972-8773-06-9.
- Boxer, Charles Ralph (1992). O Império Marítimo Português 1415 - 1825. Lisboa: Edições 70, Lda.
- Baptista, José Alberto (2010). Lagos, o republicanismo e a administração municipal (1908–1914). Lagos: Câmara Municipal de Lagos.
- Capelo, Rui Grilo; et al. (1994). História de Portugal em datas. Lisboa: Círculo de Leitores. ISBN 9724210049.
- Cardo, Mário (1998). Lagos Cidade: Subsídios para uma Monografia. Lagos: Grupo dos Amigos de Lagos.
- Cardoso, Maria Teresa (1997). Estudo do Manuscrito Anónimo do Séc. XVIII: Descrição da Cidade de Lagos. Amadora: Livro Aberto, Editores Livreiros Lda. ISBN 9725930118.
- Coutinho, Valdemar (2008). Lagos e o Mar Através dos Tempos. Lagos: Câmara Municipal de Lagos.
- Coutinho, Valdemar (2009). Assembleia Municipal de Lagos: subsídios para a história contemporânea do Município. Lagos: Câmara Municipal de Lagos.
- Ferreira, João (2011). Histórias rocambolescas da história de Portugal (in Portuguese). Lisboa: A Esfera dos Livros. ISBN 978-989-626-216-7.
- Ferro, Silvestre (2007). Vultos na toponímia de Lagos 2nd ed. Lagos: Câmara Municipal de Lagos. ISBN 9789728773113.
- Formosinho, José (1935). Efemérides (PDF). Costa de Oiro. Lagos: Tipografia Ferreira.
- Loureiro, Rui Manuel (2008). Lagos e os Descobrimentos até 1460. Lagos: Câmara Municipal de Lagos.
- Magalhães, Joaquim Romero (2004). Foral de Lagos de 1504. Lagos: Câmara Municipal de Lagos. 206 páginas. ISBN 9729912122.
- Marques, António Henrique R. de Oliveira (1987). Portugal quinhentista: ensaios (in Portuguese). Lisboa: Quetzal Editores.
- Martins, José António de Jesus (2001). Lagos Medieval. Lagos: (edição do autor). ISBN 9729711038.
- Neves, José Acúrsio das (1985). História Geral da Invasão dos Franceses em Portugal, e da Restauração deste Reino. Volumes I, II, III, IV and IV. Lisboa: Edições Afrontamento.
- Paula, Rui Mendes (1992). Lagos, evolução urbana e patrimonio. Lagos: Câmara Municipal. ISBN 9789729567629.
- Pinharanda, João Lima; Soares, António Martins (2005). Lagos, anos 60–80. Lagos: Câmara Municipal de Lagos.
- Rocha, Manoel João Paulo (1910). Monographia as forças militares de Lagos nas Guerras da Restauração e Peninsular e nas pugnas pela liberdade (in Portuguese). Typographia Universal.
- Rodrigues, Luís Azevedo; Agostinho, Margarida (2016). Lagos: Guia de Geologia e Paleontologia Urbana. Lagos: Centro de Ciência Viva. ISBN 9789899951921.
- Salentiny, Fernand; Waldmann, Werner (2006). Enciclopédia Dos Exploradores Do Mundo. Lisboa: Centralivros, Lda. ISBN 9727911692.
- Veloso, José (2010). Lagos: Brevíssima foto-história da cidade marítima: Ao longo do século XX, memória da cidade bela. 3rd ed.

Municipality of Faro District (Algarve)

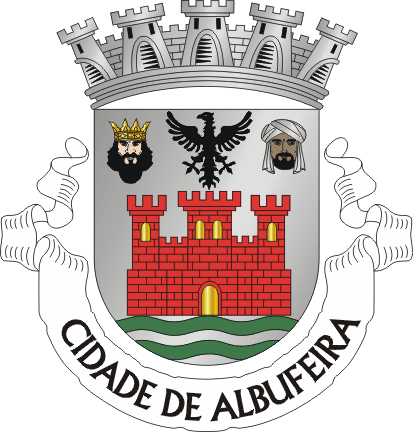
Albufeira

Albufeira

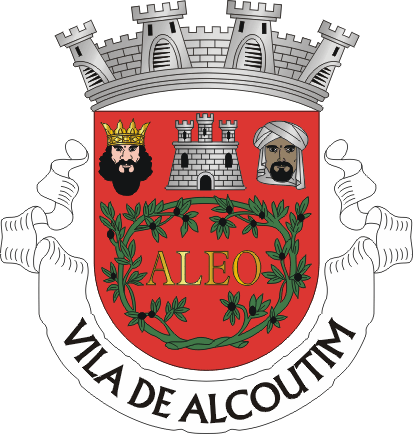
Alcoutim

Alcoutim

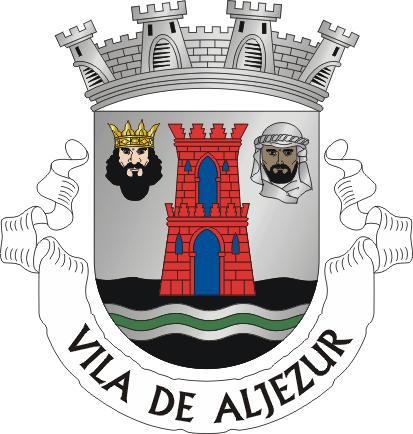
Aljezur

Aljezur

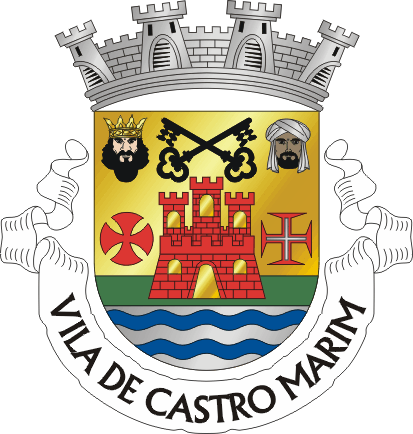
Castro Marim

Castro Marim

Faro

Faro

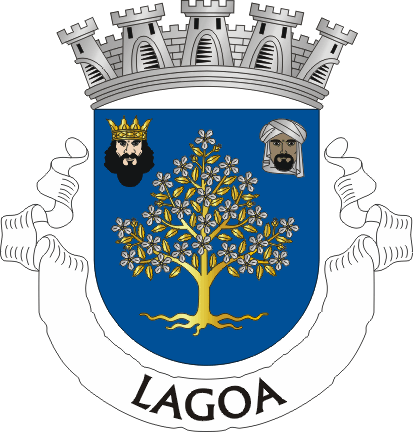
Lagoa

Lagoa

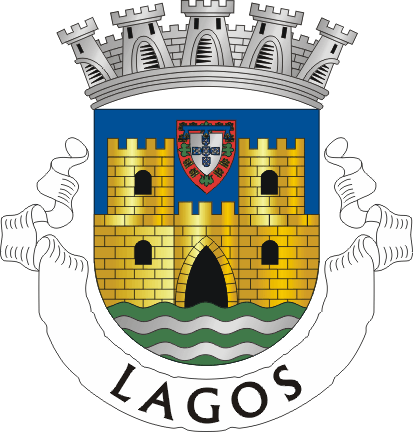
Lagos

Lagos

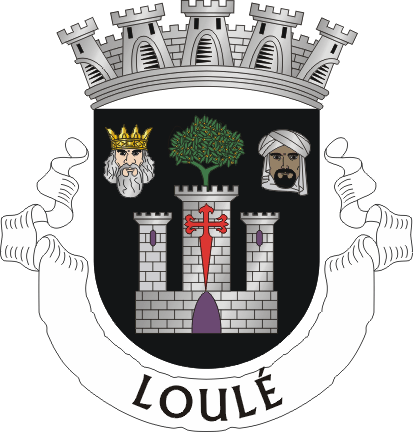
Loulé

Loulé

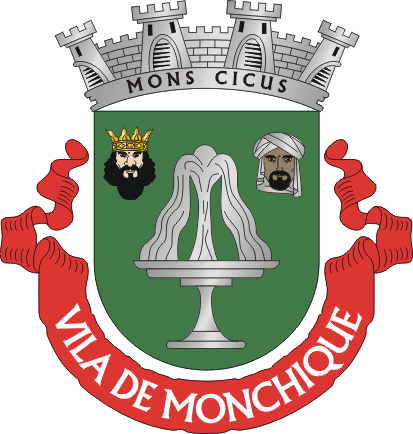
Monchique

Monchique

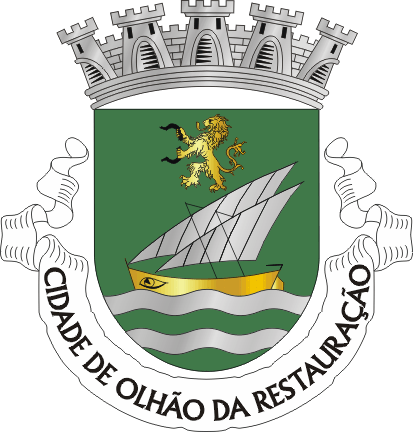
Olhão

Olhão

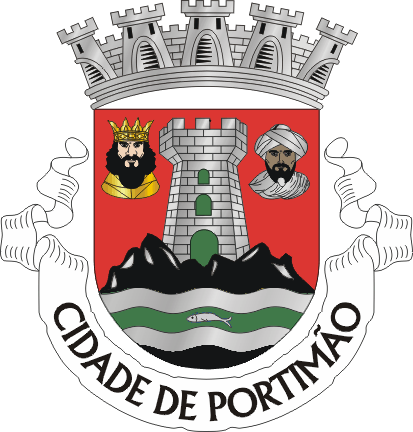
Portimão

Portimão

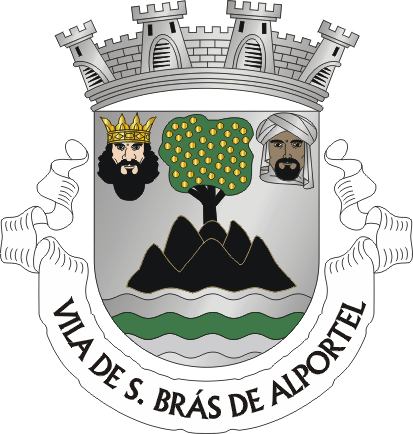
São Brás de Alportel

São Brás de Alportel

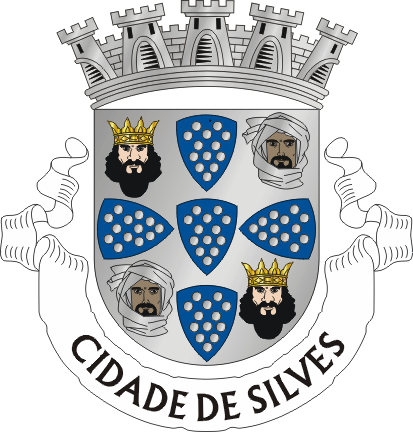
Silves (Portugal)

Silves

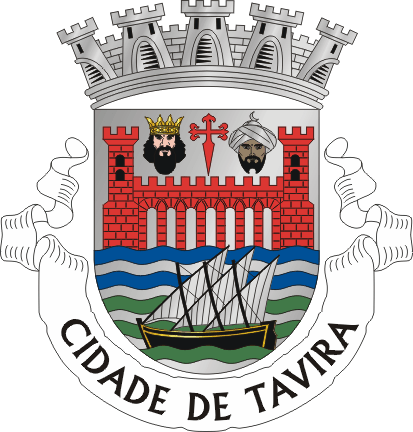
Tavira

Tavira

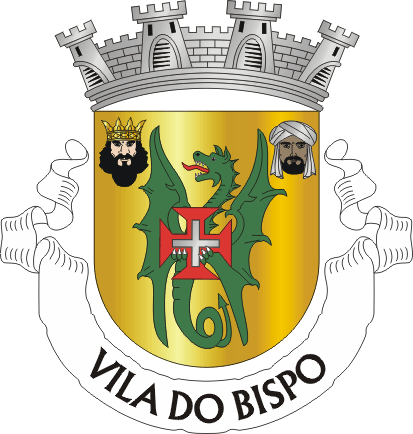
Vila do Bispo

Vila do Bispo

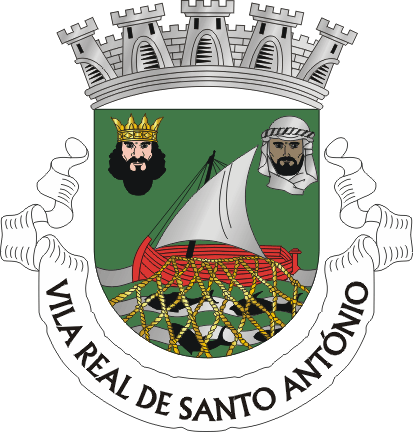
Vila Real de Santo António

Vila Real de Santo António
