= Fort of Ponta da Bandeira =

17th-century fort in Portugal

- Forte da Ponta da Bandeira
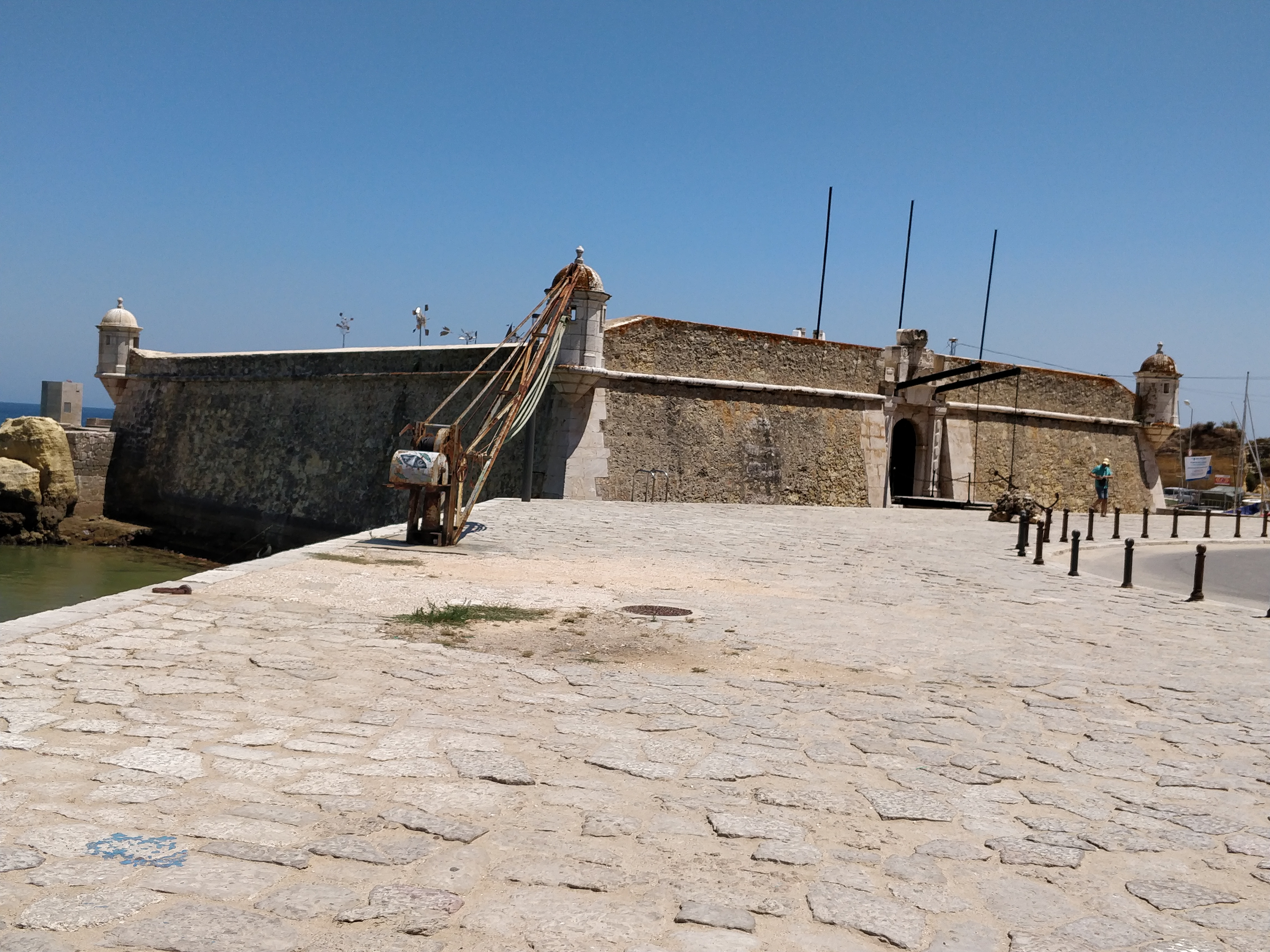
- Interactive map of the Fort of Ponta da Bandeira area

General information
- Status: Preserved
- Type: Fortification
- Location: Lagos, Portugal, Portugal
- Coordinates: 37.099050°N 8.668270°W
- Inaugurated: 1690
- Owner: Lagos municipality

The Fort of Ponta da Bandeira (Forte da Ponta da Bandeira), also known as Pau da Bandeira Fort (Flag's Mast Fort); Fort of Nossa Senhora da Penha de França (Our Lady of the Penha de França Fort); the Fort of Registo (Registry fort); or the Fort of Lagos is situated in the city of Lagos, in the Faro District of Portugal. It was built in the 17th century, as one of the main components of a system of maritime fortifications to defend the city, then headquarters of the military government of the Algarve. Significant restoration work has been carried out over the years and the fort is considered to be one of the best-preserved 17th century fortifications in the Algarve region.

== Description ==
The Fort is located at the point where the Bensafrim River meets the Atlantic Ocean. This position was of great strategic importance, being close to the walls of the city but with easy access to the sea. In this way it could protect both access to the quays along the banks of the river and the south-eastern and eastern sides of the walls, and allow crossfire with the bastions of Lagos Castle and the city gates.

At the time of its construction it was considered one of the most advanced in the Algarve region. It was planned for artillery battles, with a regular square-shaped layout, with thick walls on the sides facing the ocean. Access to the upper terrace is via a ramp. The building was partially surrounded by a moat, having only one entrance, which was accessed through a drawbridge. Above the entrance is a stone coat of arms, and a stone plaque indicating that construction was started by the Count of Sarzedas and completed by the Marquis of Nisa. It has several cylindrical sentry-boxes, which were not part of the original structure. Inside there are now several rooms for exhibitions, a restaurant and a small chapel, completely covered with tiles and dedicated to Saint Barbara.

== Construction ==
After the beginning of the Restoration War in the 17th century, which pitted Portugal against Spain, there was a change in the Portuguese military strategy, with greater attention being paid to land defence on the Spanish border. Along the coast only batteries were installed, with functions more linked to surveillance than defence. This approach resulted from the poor state of the Spanish fleet and the signing of a peace agreement with Holland, which had a sizeable fleet. During the Restoration War the Algarve thus played a very peripheral role, and its defensive structures began to deteriorate.

After the Restoration War, the Algarve coast was frequently attacked by pirates and privateers, so the construction of a network of maritime defences was ordered to protect the city of Lagos, which at that time was the seat of the military government of the Algarve. Designed by Captain Inácio Pereira, the Ponta da Bandeira Fort began to be built around 1680, by order of Luís Lopo da Silveira, 2nd Count of Sarzedas and Governor of the Kingdom of the Algarve. It was completed in 1690, under the guidance of Francisco Luís Baltazar da Gama (1636–1707), 6th Count of Vidigueira and 2nd Marquis of Nisa. The chapel appears to have also been built at that time, since the tiles inside it also date from the 17th century.

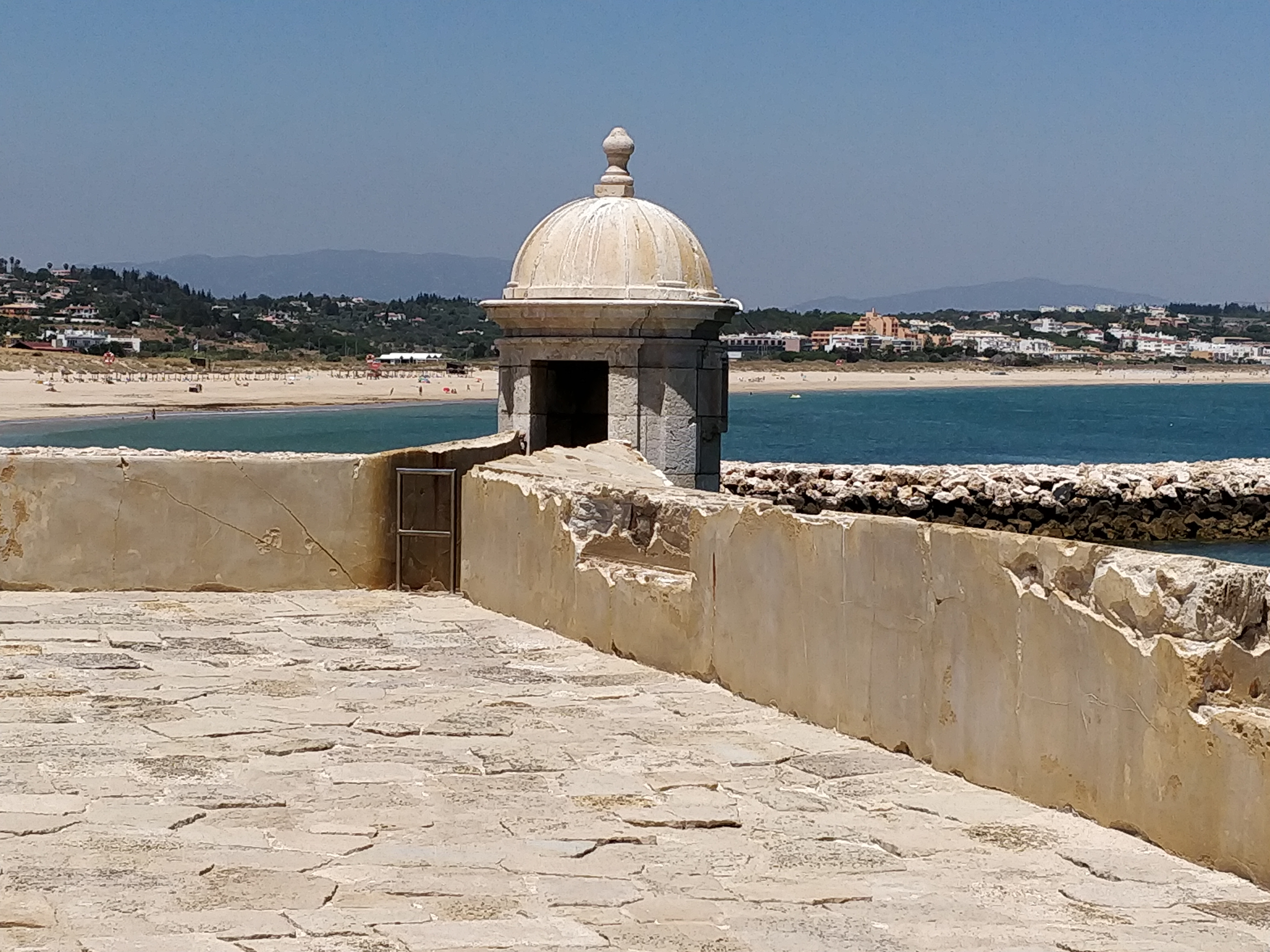
Interior of the fort

The fort was considered one of the most advanced in the Algarve region, reflecting several decades of development of Portuguese military architecture. It has a very simple shape, being just a square with an elevated terrace facing the ocean that is reached by a ramp. There are several gun emplacements. It exemplified the change in military policies after the Restoration War, which reduced emphasis on large coastal fortresses, preferring instead more, but smaller, fortifications. The strength of its construction has meant that it has remained relatively intact, while other fortifications in the Algarve have been greatly modified or destroyed over the years.

== History ==
The fort was badly damaged by the 1755 Lisbon Earthquake. Priority was given to restoring the defences of Lagos after the earthquake, in order to protect the population from raids from the sea. In 1769 it was reportedly suffering damage due to the force of the ocean waters. In the 19th century it was showing signs of decay and in 1826 it was the object of restoration work on the walls by the Ministry of War. In 1828, the fort briefly housed forty political prisoners. In an article in the newspaper O Panorama of 5 November 1842, it was reported that the Fort of Ponta da Bandeira was unable to effectively defend the bay, because it lacked the proper garrison and artillery.

In the 20th century, the fort underwent several changes in its structure. One of the biggest interventions started in 1956, when changes were made to accommodate the naval branch of the Mocidade Portuguesa, a youth organization of the totalitarian Estado Novo government. In 1960, a stone flagstone floor was installed in the courtyard, stonework was applied to the walls, the moat and the drawbridge were built, and a lighthouse was mounted on the dock attached to the fort. In 1970, considerable maintenance was carried out. At the end of the 1970s, the fort was sold to the Municipality of Lagos. Since then it has had various uses and can also be visited for a small fee.
