= Igreja de São Sebastião (Lagos) =

Church in Lagos, Portugal

Coordinates: 37°06′14″N 8°40′26″W

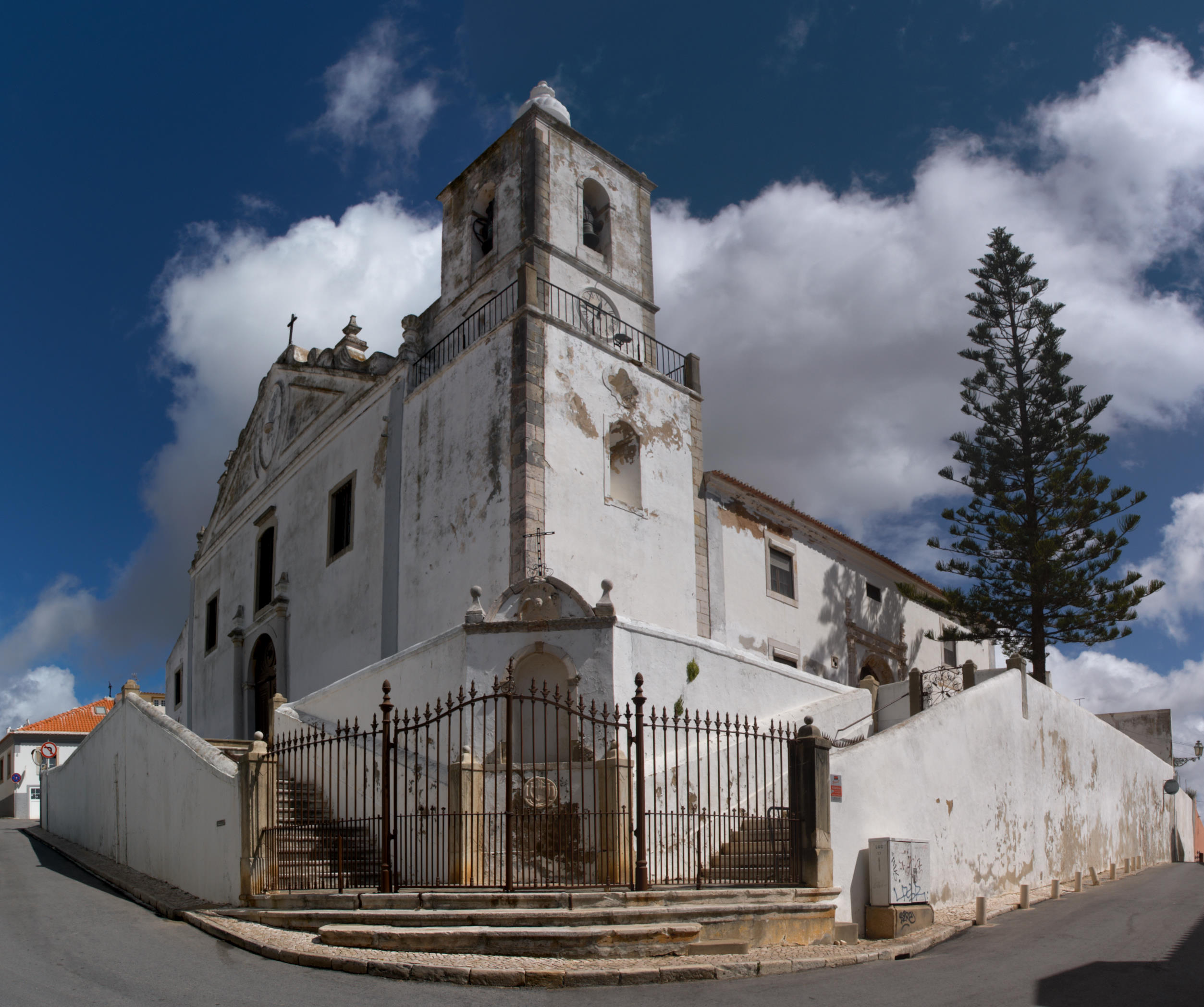
Igreja de San Sebastiao, Lagos, Portugal

Igreja de São Sebastião is a church in Portugal. It is classified as a National Monument.
