= Bensafrim River =

River of the Algarve, Portugal

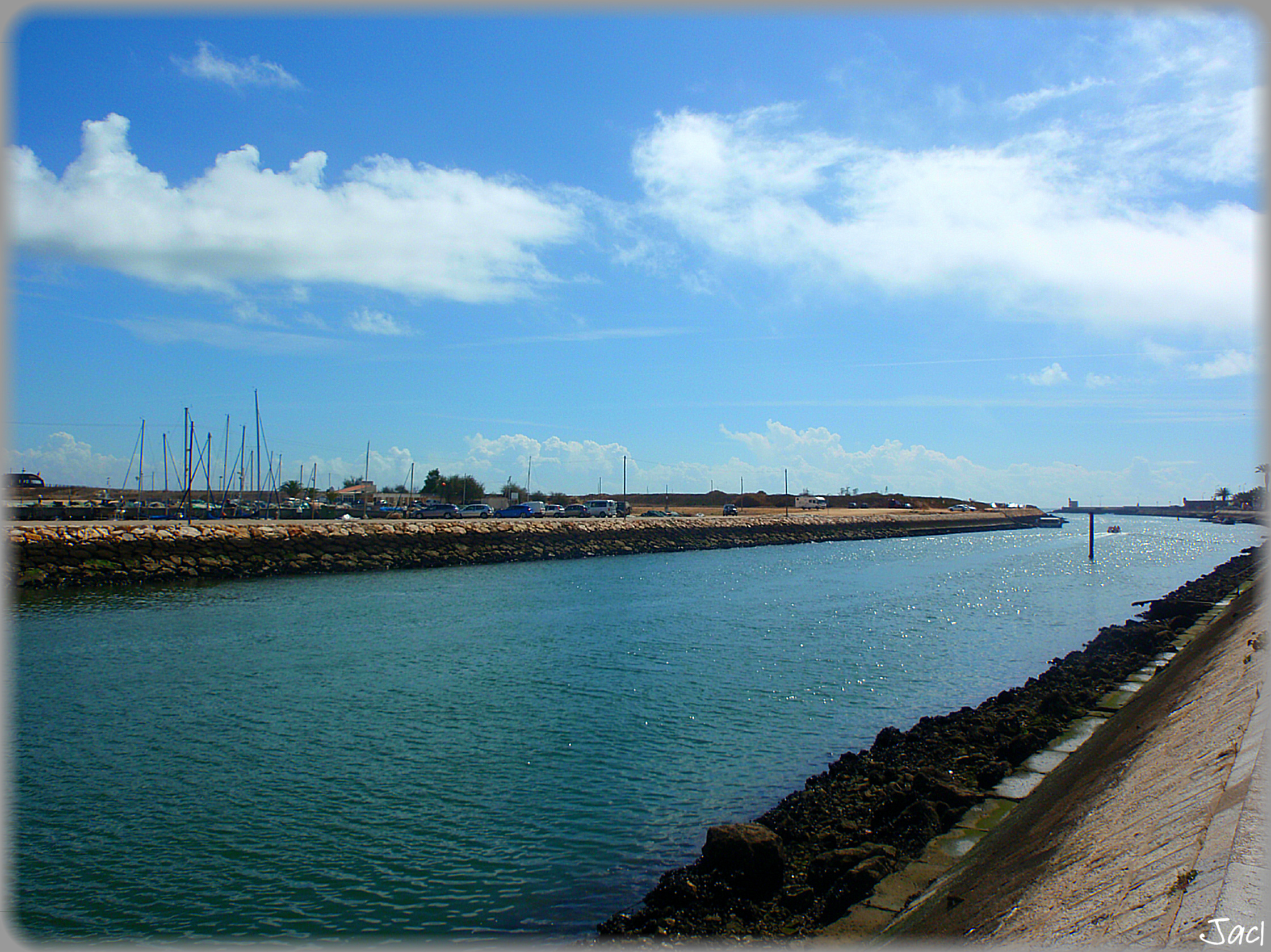
- Bensafrim River in Lagos.

Location
- Country: Portugal

Physical characteristics
- Source: Serra de Espinhaço de Cão
  - location: Monchique Range
- Mouth: Lagos
  - location: Atlantic Ocean, Algarve,
- Discharge
  - location: Lagos

The Bensafrim River (Portuguese: Ribeira de Bensafrim, Portuguese pronunciation: [ʁiˈβɐjɾɐ ðɨ βɐ̃jzɐˈfɾĩ]) is a river in Portugal.

The Bensafrim River is a small stream, and its bar almost dries at low water. The bar is only passable by boats from half flood to half ebb.
