= Ponta da Piedade Lighthouse =

Lighthouse in Portugal

Ponta da Piedade Lighthouse Farol da Ponta da Piedade
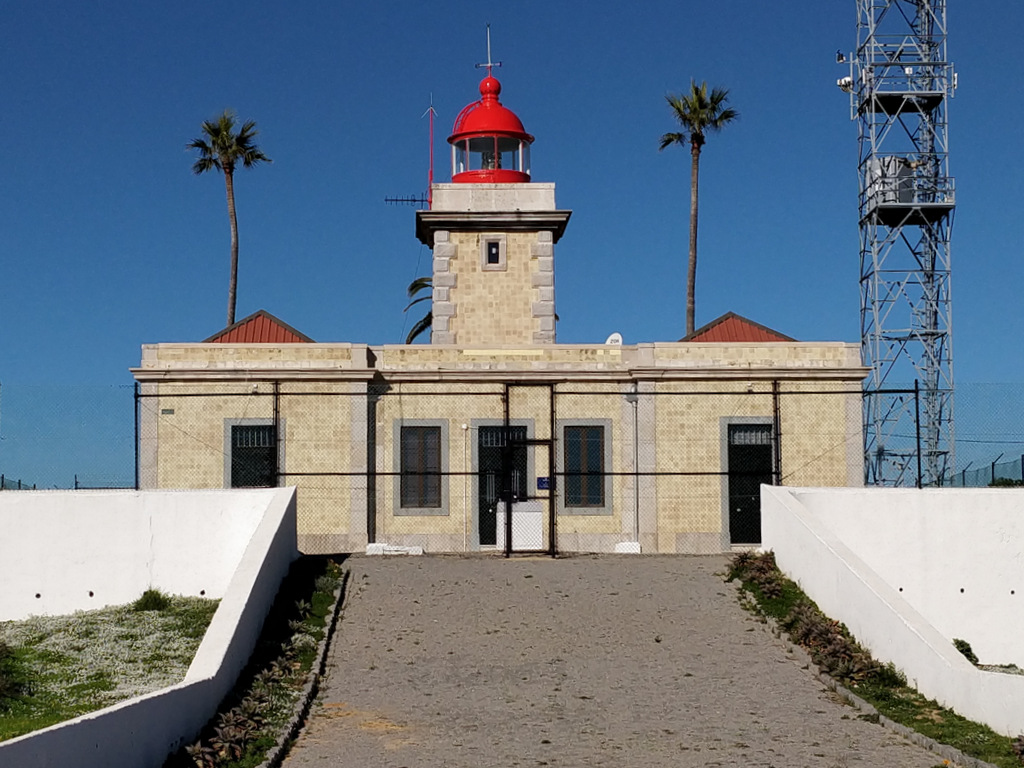
- Location: Lagos, Faro District, Algarve, Portugal
- Coordinates: 37°04′50″N 8°40′10″W

Tower
- Constructed: 1913
- Construction: stone
- Automated: 1983
- Height: 51 metres (167 ft)
- Heritage: heritage without legal protection

Light
- Focal height: 51 m (167 ft)
- Lens: Fourth-order Fresnel 300mm
- Range: 20 nautical miles
- Characteristic: Fl W 7s

The Ponta da Piedade Lighthouse (Portuguese: Farol da Ponta da Piedade) is located at Ponta da Piedade in Lagos, in the Algarve region of Portugal. It started operations in mid-1913.

== History ==
The lighthouse is a stone tower of masonry, 51 metres above sea level, with an attached keeper's house. It has a red flashlight. Despite plans having been made as early as 1883, it was not erected until 1912–13, on the site of the ruins of the "Nossa Senhora da Piedade" hermitage and a farmhouse that was bought from the owners. The delay was in part due to the opposition of the local parish council to the construction as it involved the destruction of the remains of the hermitage. Ponta da Piedade is now a well-known tourist location because of its rock formations, which can be visited by boats on hire close to the lighthouse.

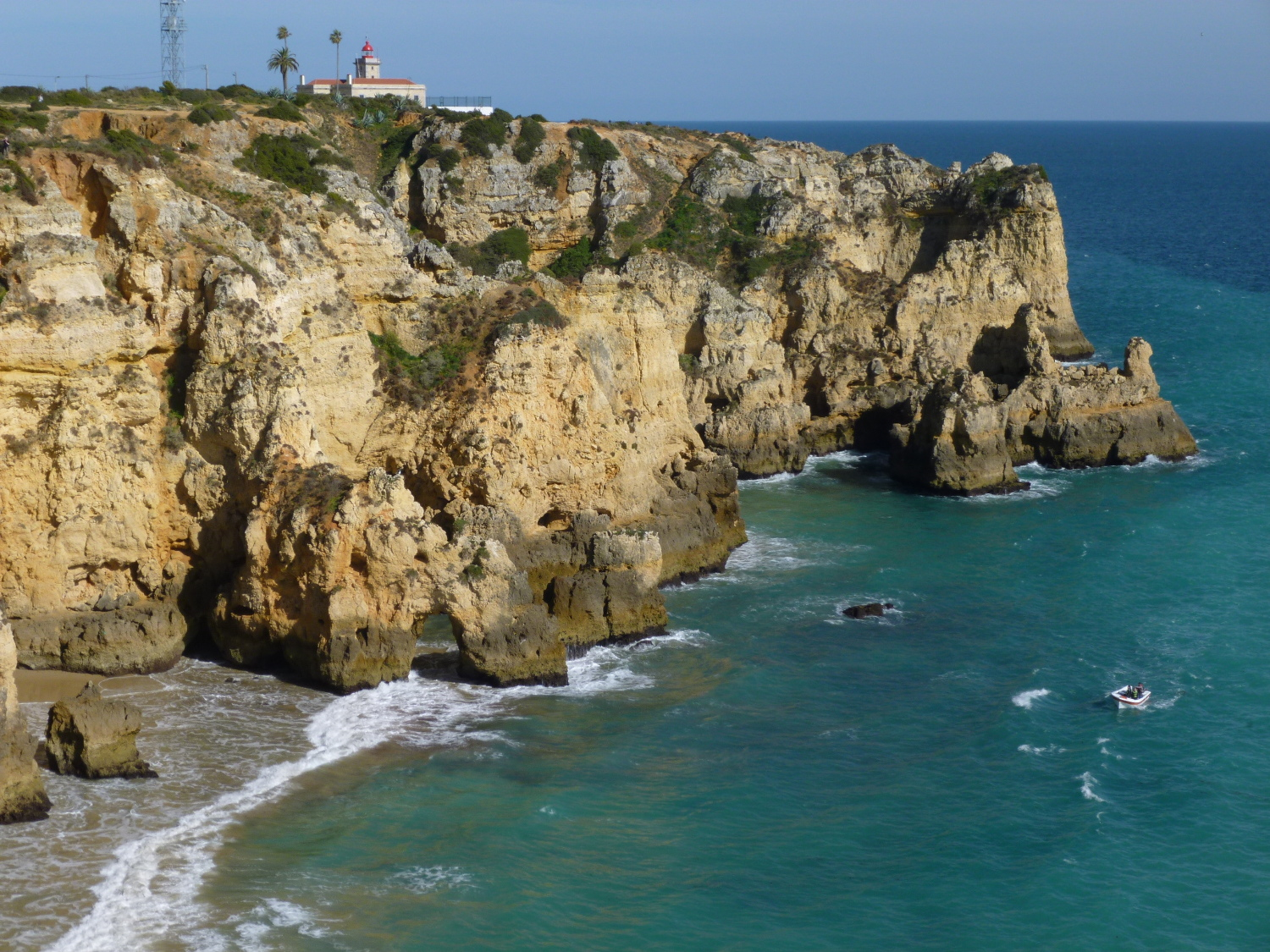
Distant view of the lighthouse on the Ponta da Piedade cliffs

Initially the lighthouse had a fourth-order Fresnel lens that emitted five flashes, grouped every ten seconds. The light source was an oil lamp and the range was 18 nautical miles. The 4th order lens was temporarily replaced during 1923 by a 6th order with a fixed white light. In 1952, the lighthouse was electrified with power from the public grid, and the oil lamp was replaced with an electric lamp, with an initial range of 15 nautical miles, subsequently increased to 18 nautical miles. Four years later, a new electric filament was mounted. It was automated in 1983, using a system supplied by the Gisman company, with one white light flash every seven seconds.

== See also ==
- List of lighthouses in Portugal
