= Menir da Cabeça do Rochedo =

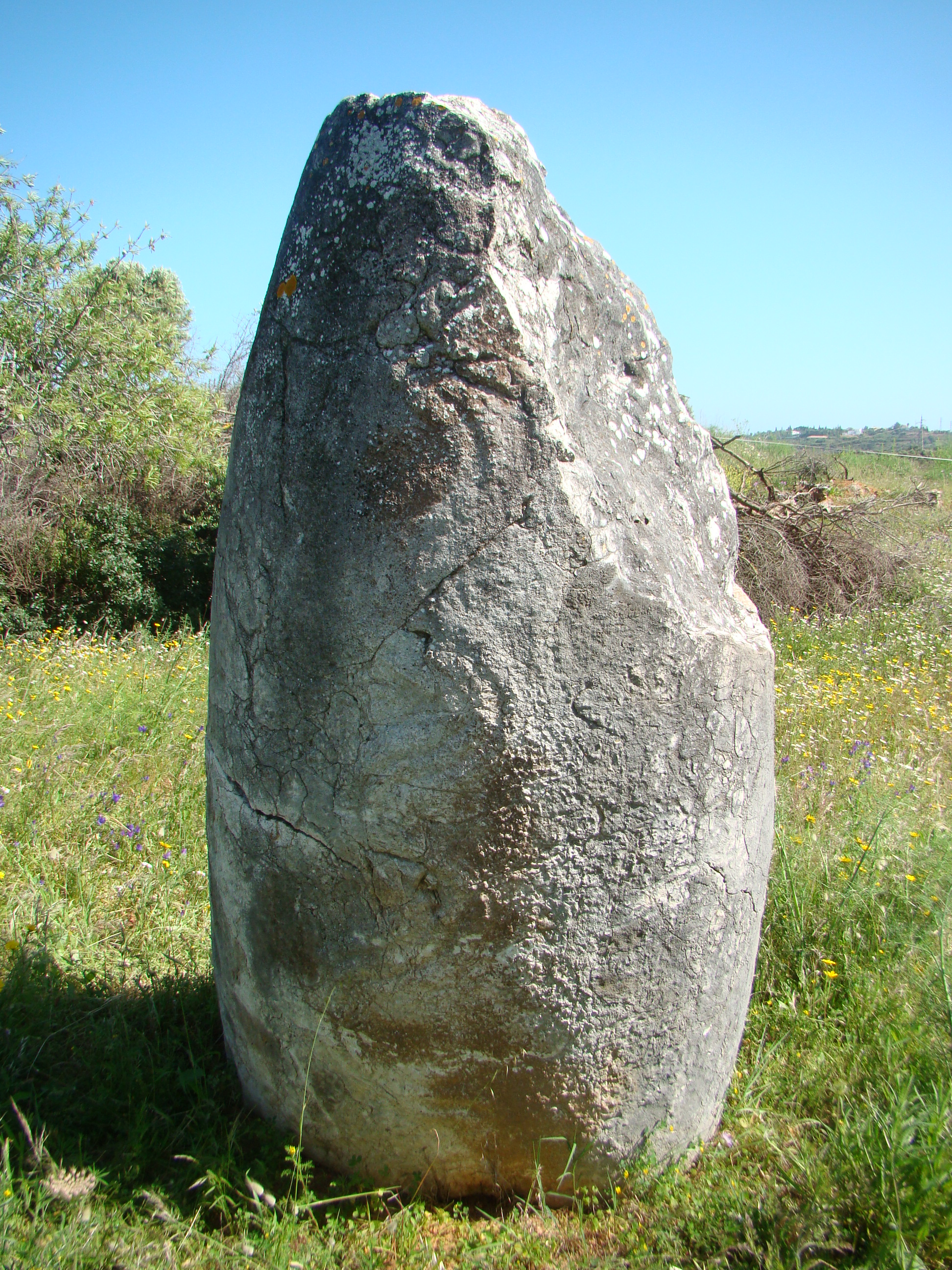
A spiral shaped engraving is slightly visible

Menir da Cabeça do Rochedo

The Menir da Cabeça do Rochedo is an obelisk-like monument made from limestone, located just north of the town of Lagos, Portugal.

Dating back to the early Neolithic, and of a considerable weight and size, it has a cylindrical shape and a decorative spiral-like engraving that's faintly discernible. It was part of a group of eight other similar monuments, of which just one is still standing in its original location. The rest were taken by Lagos's city hall for preservation. Just like other Menhirs found in the Algarve, the Cabeça do Rochedo Menir did not serve funerary purposes, and the end it served is still debated. The monument is located at a hill just outside of Portelas, 6 km north of Lagos.
