= Lagos, Portugal =

Lagos
- Municipality
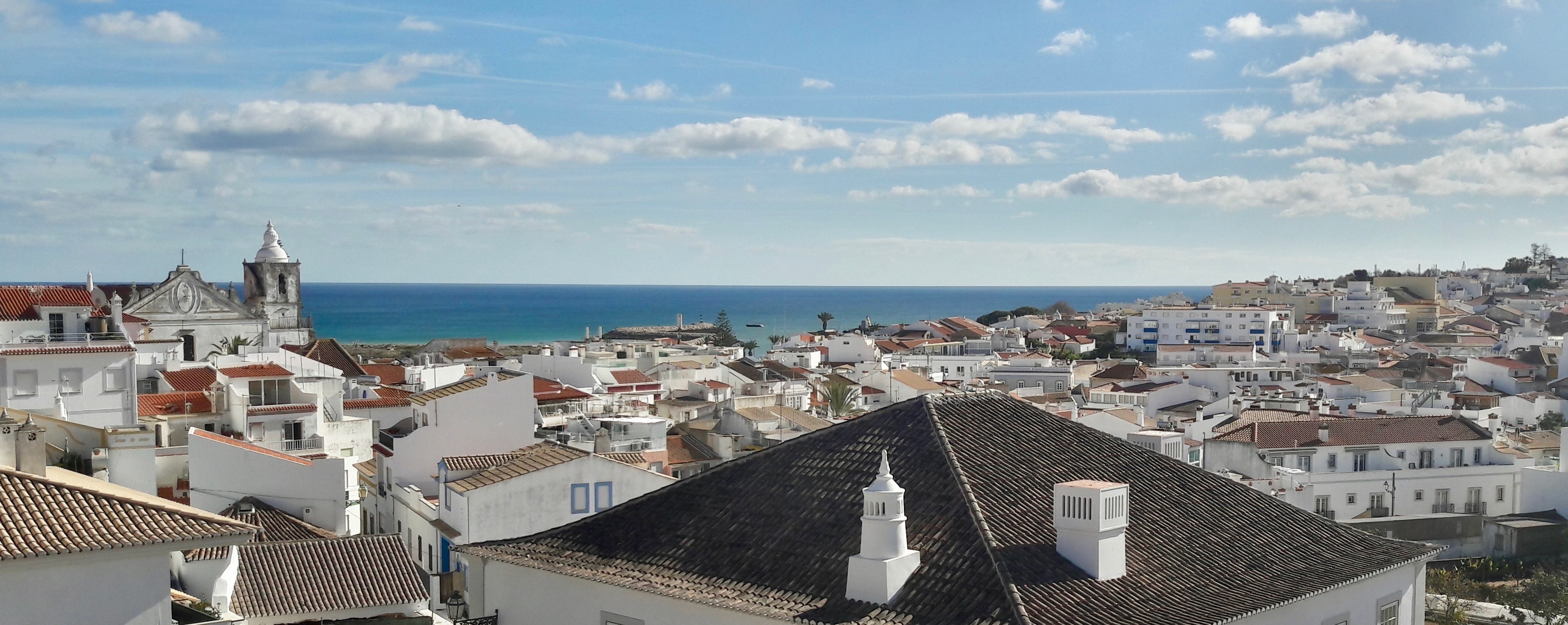
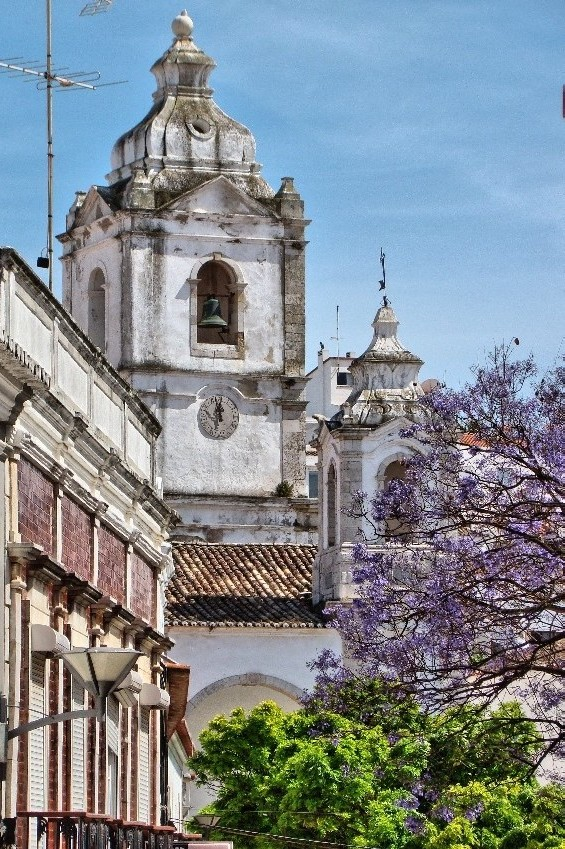
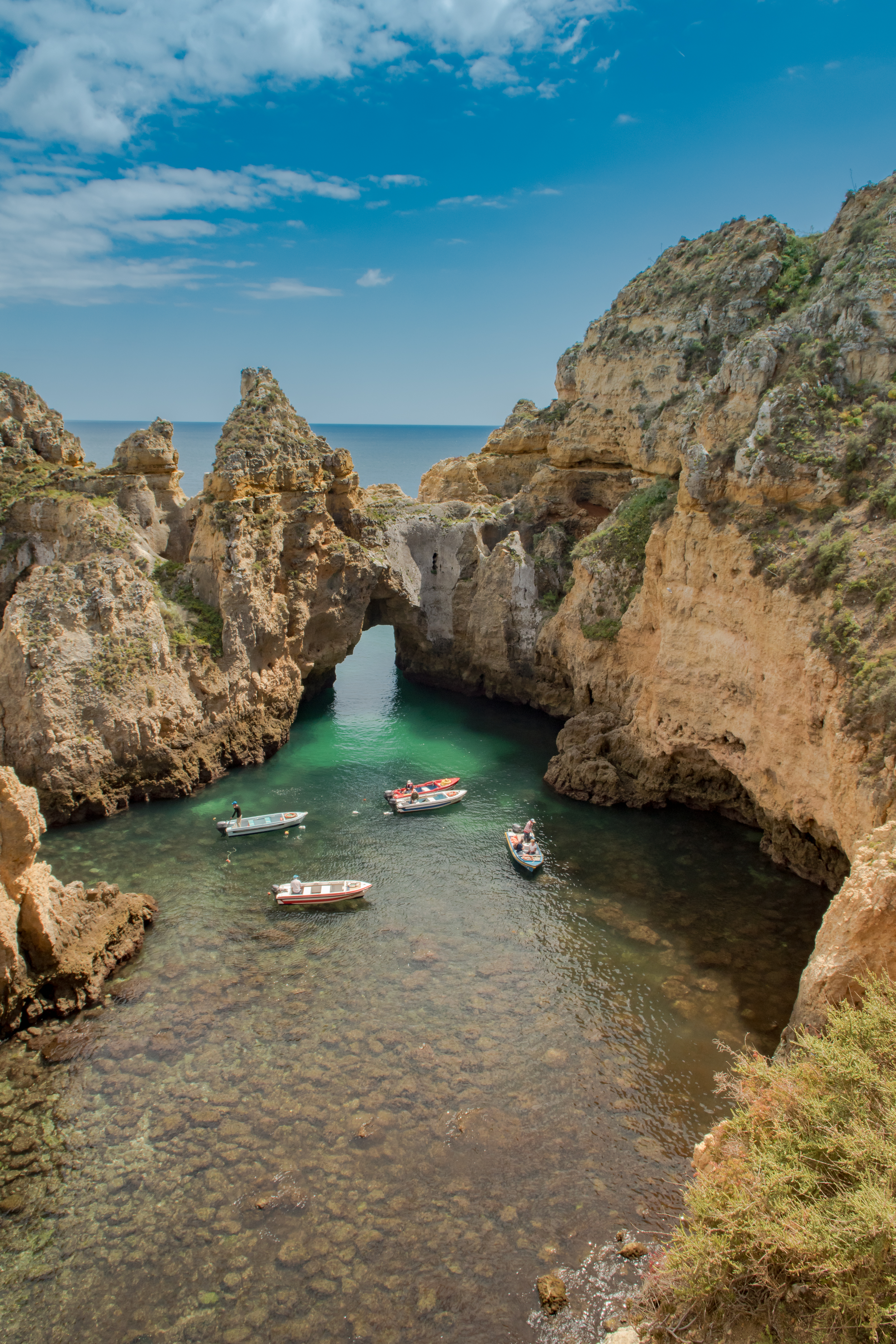
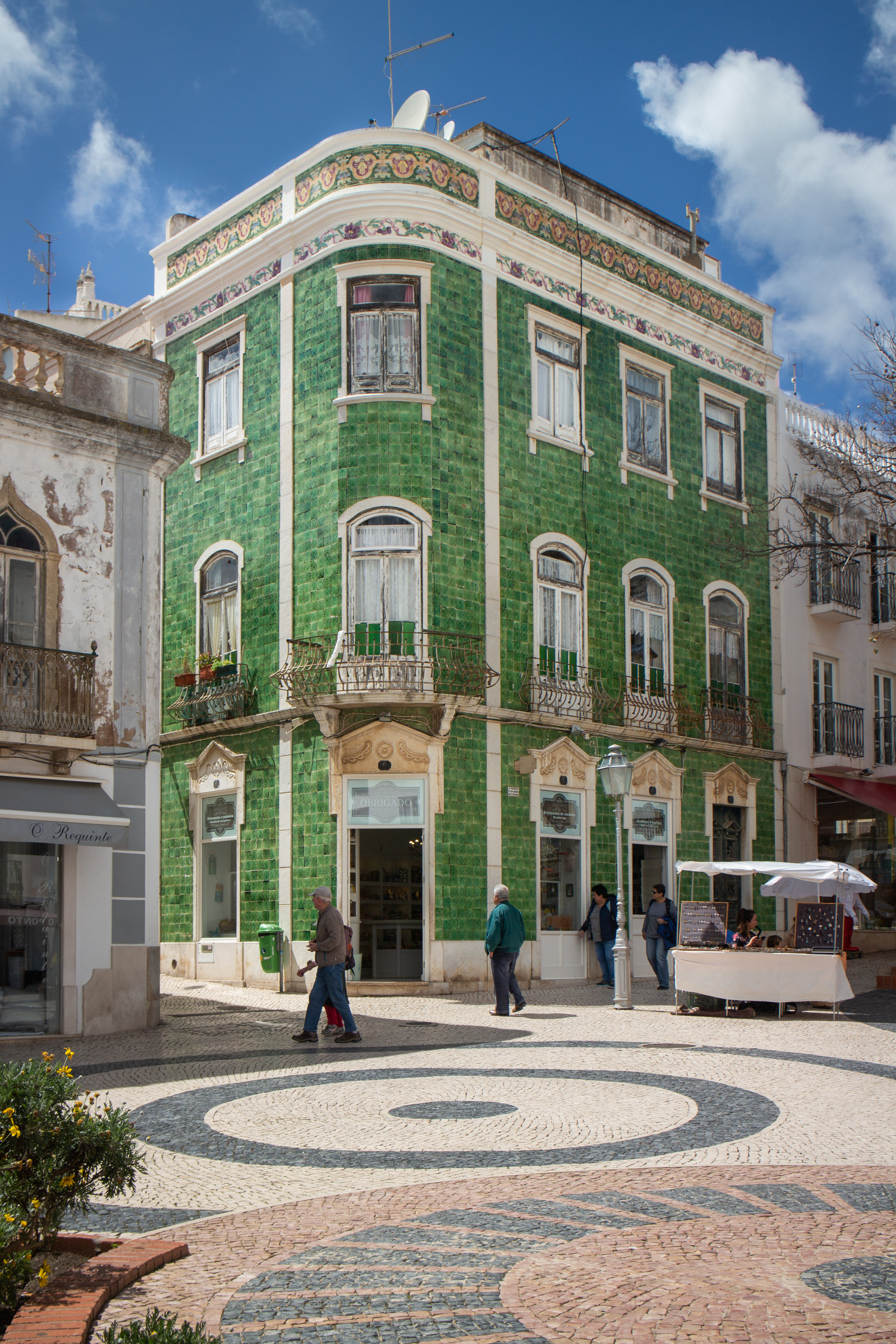
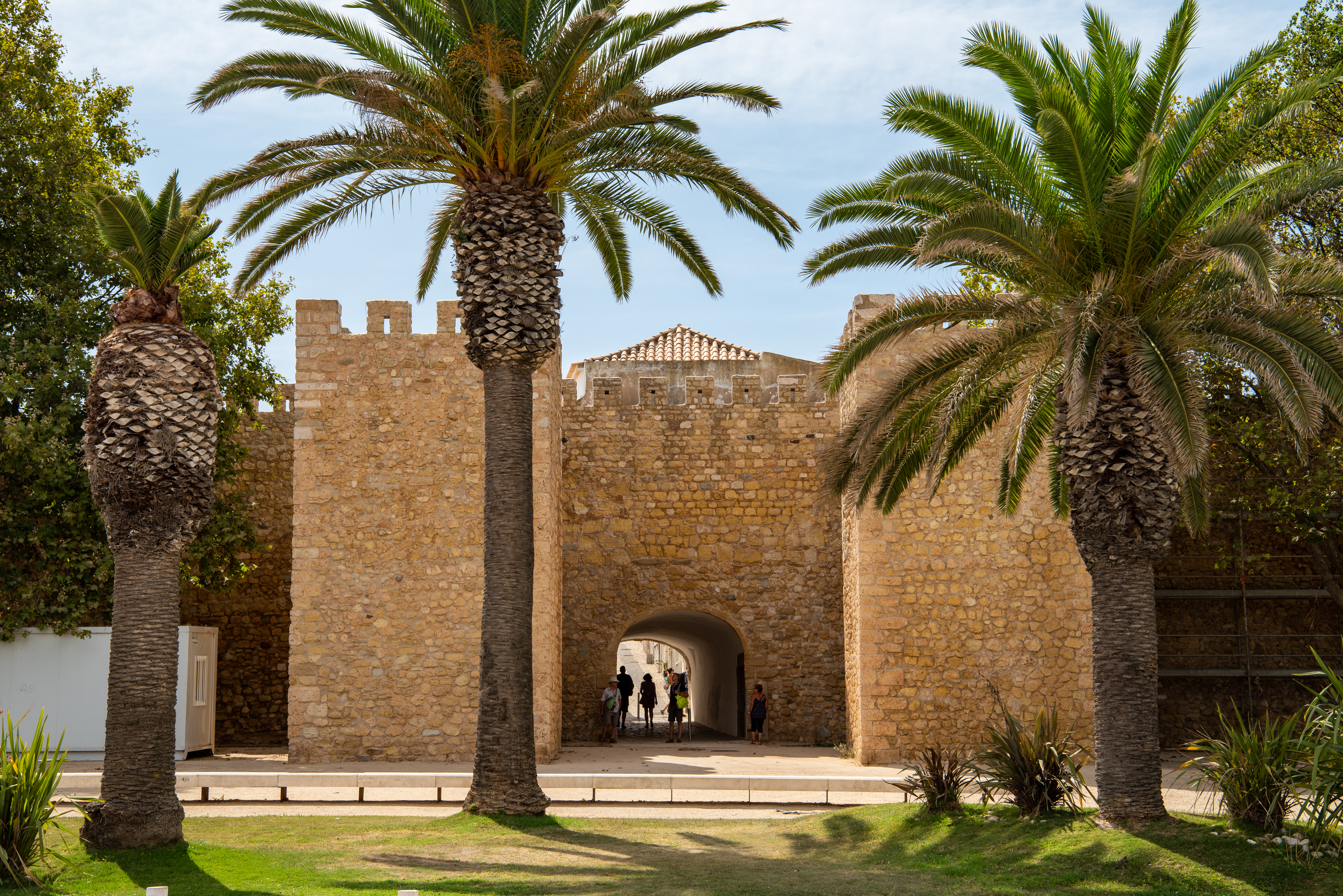
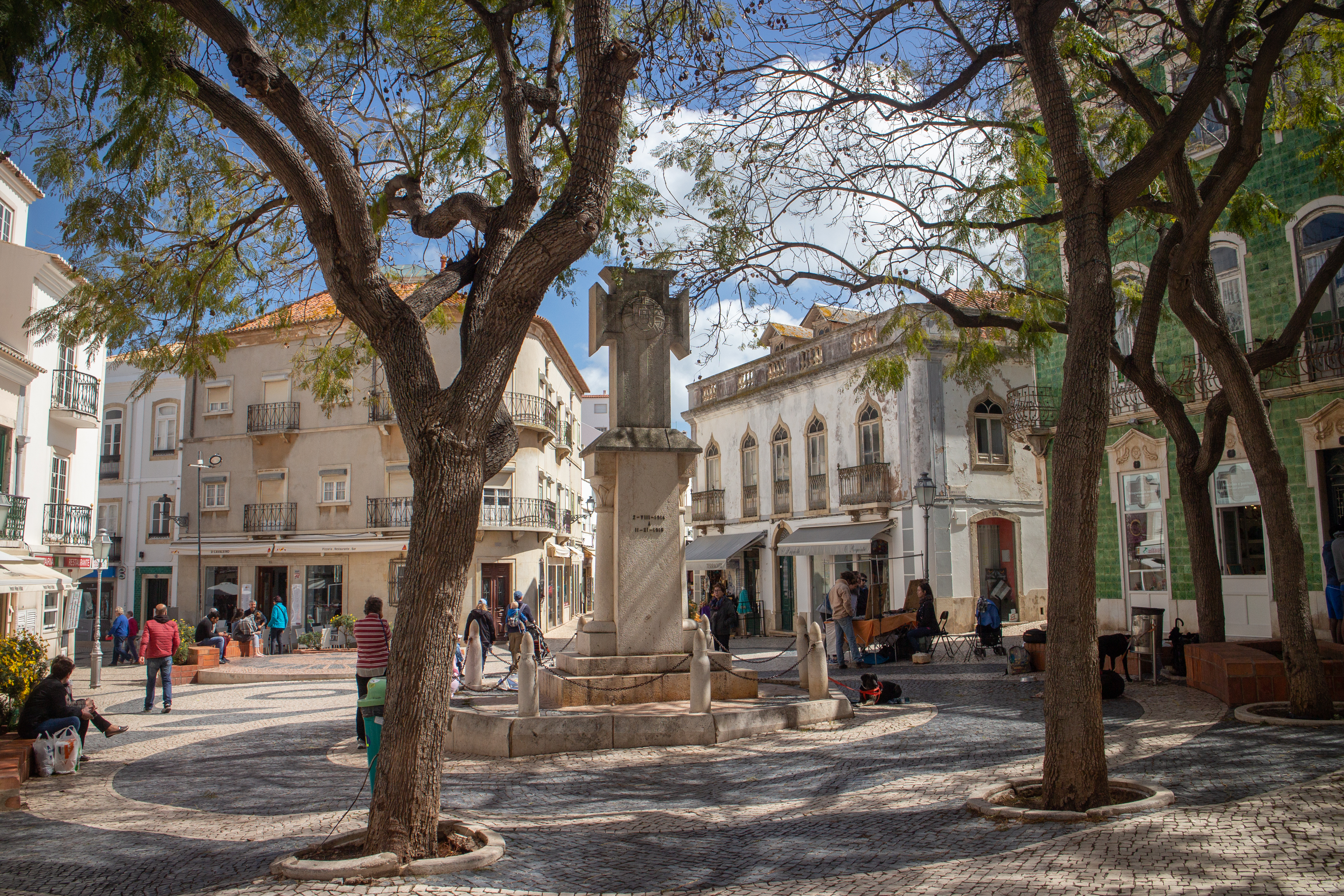

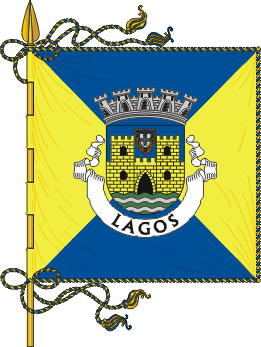
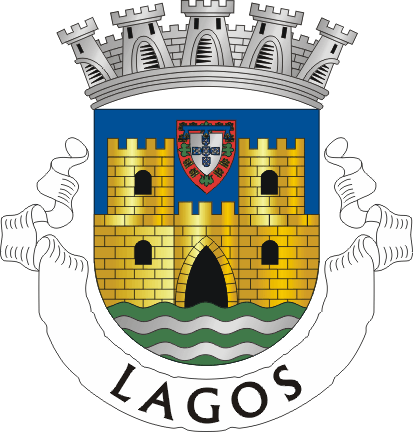
- Flag Coat of arms
- Interactive map of Lagos
- Location in Portugal
- Coordinates: 37°6′10″N 8°40′22″W
- Country: Portugal
- Region: Algarve
- Intermunic. comm.: Algarve
- District: Faro
- Parishes: 4

Government
  - President: Joaquina Matos (PS)

Area
  - Total: 212.99 km^{2} (82.24 sq mi)

Population (2021)
  - Total: 33,494
  - Density: 157.26/km^{2} (407.29/sq mi)
- Time zone: UTC+00:00 (WET)
  - Summer (DST): UTC+01:00 (WEST)
- Postal code: 8600
- Area code: 282
- Website: www.cm-lagos.pt

Lagos (pronounced [ˈlaɣuʃ]; Proto-Celtic: *Lacobriga) is a city and municipality in the Barlavento region of the Algarve, southern Portugal, situated at the mouth of the Bensafrim River along the Atlantic Ocean. As of the March 2021 census, the municipality had a population of 33,494 across an area of 212.99 km². The coastal area is densely populated and oriented toward tourism and services, while the inland region is sparsely inhabited with an economy based largely on agriculture and forestry. The population increases significantly during summer months due to tourism.

Lagos is one of the most visited cities in the Algarve, attracting tourists with its beaches, rock formations such as Ponta da Piedade, and summer nightlife. The city also holds significant historical importance as a centre of the Portuguese Age of Discovery, a frequent residence of Henry the Navigator, a historical shipbuilding hub, and, at one point, a centre of the European slave trade.

Lagos, Nigeria, may derive its name from the Portuguese city, as Lagos was the principal base for Portuguese maritime expeditions along the West African coast during the 15th century.

== History ==
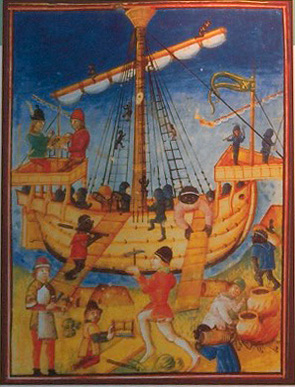
A painting from the 16th century showing a caravel being provisioned in the port of Lagos depicting Africans and Europeans

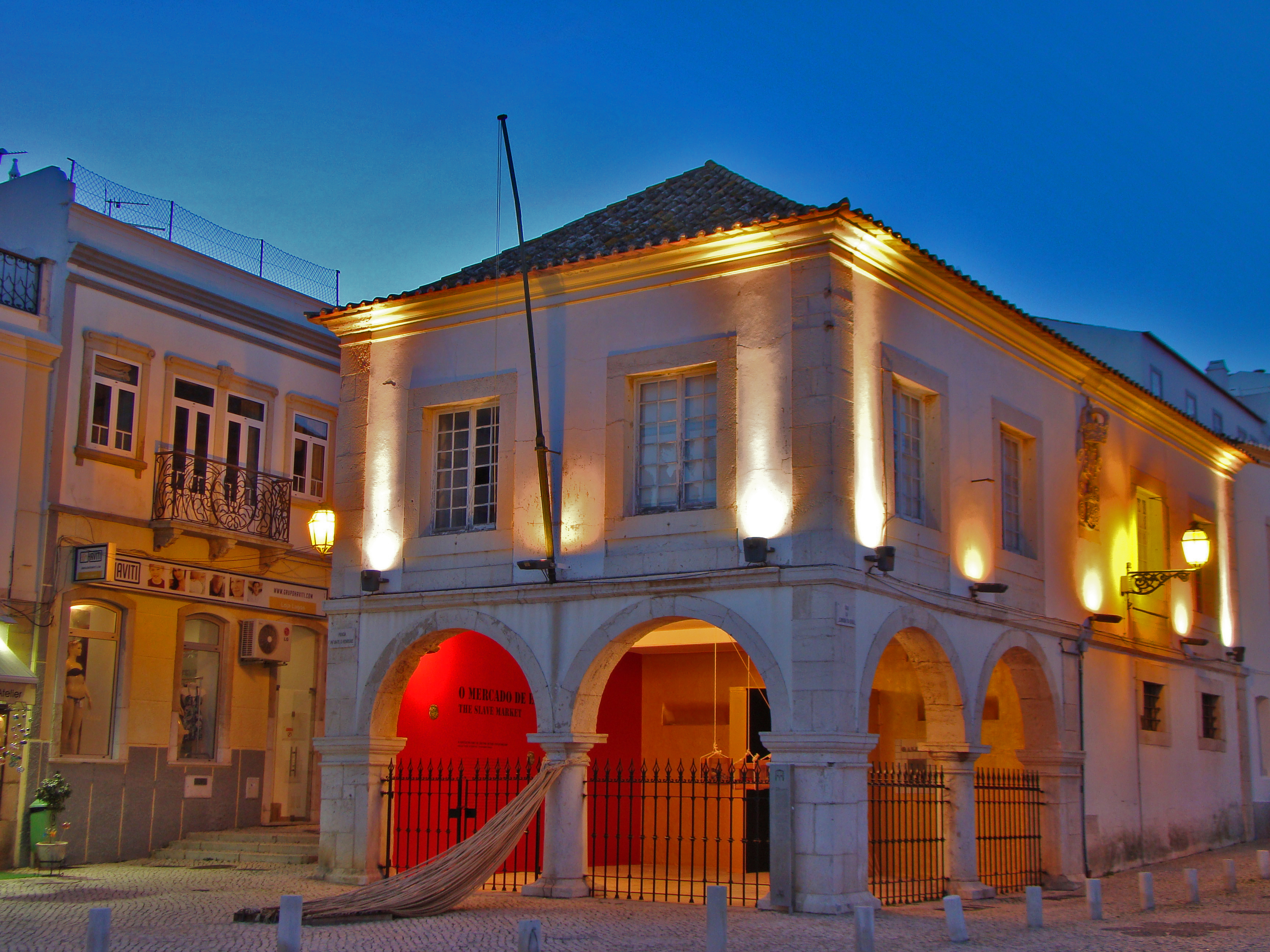
Lagos's slave market. Built in 1444, it was colonial Europe's first slave market

Lagos is an ancient maritime town with more than 2000 years of history. The name Lagos comes from a Celtic settlement, derived from the Latin Lacobriga, the name of the settlement was established during the pre-Punic civilizations. It became an early settlement of the Carthaginians, who recruited Celtic tribesmen in their war against the Romans (the Punic Wars). Owing to its already important harbour, it was colonized by the Romans and integrated into the Roman province of Lusitania, becoming known as Lacobriga. Quintus Sertorius, a rebellious Roman general, helped by the Lusitanians of Lacobriga (who had been oppressed under Roman Generals and members of Lucius Cornelius Sulla party), successfully defeated the Roman army of Caecilius Metellus Pius probably at nearby Monte Molião.

With the fall of Rome, the town of Lagos was occupied in the sixth century by the Visigoths from the Kingdom of Toledo and later by the Byzantines. The Moors arrived in the 8th century from North Africa, renaming the settlement Zawaia (meaning lago, or lake). It became part of the much larger coastal region of al-Gharb, which eventually became known as the Algarve. The Moors fortified the town with Lagos Castle and established important trade links to Northern Africa from their bases in the Iberian peninsula. In 1174, the local wālī gave permission for the Christian peoples to construct a church dedicated to São João Baptista, which was built outside the town's walls (becoming the oldest church in the Algarve).

=== Kingdom ===
Even as King Afonso Henriques advanced to the south, the Christian Reconquista never made it into Algarve and Alentejo, and the south remained under Moorish control. King Sancho I, with the support of Crusader forces used Lagos as a stepping stone to attack the fortress of Alvôr. Zawaia was eventually captured by King Afonso III of Portugal in 1241, but was only taken definitively in 1249. From this period on the King began self-styling himself as the "King of Portugal and the Algarve", stressing the fact that the Algarve (which had for so long been ruled by the Moors as a foreign country) had been annexed into the dominion of the Portuguese. Lagos became an independent jurisdiction under the rule of King Peter I in 1361.

King John I assembled his fleet in the harbour of Lagos, before setting sail for the siege and conquest of the city of Ceuta in 1415. This was the first step in opening the Muslim world to medieval Europe, which in fact led to the Age of Discovery with Portuguese explorers sailing across the whole world. By the 15th century, Lagos became the centre of Portuguese maritime exploration, with ships ordered south to trace the shoreline of Africa in order to find routes to India. Infante Henry the Navigator, third son of King John, lived most of the time in Lagos. From here he directed expeditions to Morocco and to the western coast of Africa with caravels, lateen-rigged ships with excellent seafaring capabilities. Lagos was also the home port for Gil Eanes who was the first to sail beyond Cape Bojador in 1434, after a failed attempt in 1433 that put him out of favour with the, then considered the end of the world. The act of rounding the Cape, much like the later rounding of the Cape of Good Hope, permitted Eanes (and the navigators that followed) to advance into the African subcontinent. When, by 1443, Lançarote (then fiscal officer of the crown) had sailed as far as Arguim and brought back 275 Africans, the Portuguese had sufficient slaves to relieve the perpetual handicap of agricultural labour.

Over the following decades, news of discoveries and achievements, and ships loaded with spices and goods would flow into the port of Lagos. It was also the gateway for the first African slaves into post-medieval Europe. Even before Africa was opened-up to the Portuguese, the seamen of Lagos were already unscrupulous slave traders. From the first slave markets in Lagos (the Mercado de Escravos, which opened in 1444), many Africans were dispersed throughout Europe, bringing a considerable income to the Portuguese monarchy and merchant classes, as well as cheap labour force. As the major sponsor of these expeditions, Prince Henry received one-fifth of the selling price of every slave. The demand for the indentured labour force was so high that, by 1450, profit on Mauritanian slaves was 700 percent. The discovery of gold by Alfonso Gonçales also increased activities in Lagos, whose residents petitioned the Infante Henry to establish a trading company to pursue gold deposits in the region. This included Juan Dias (ancestor of Bartolomeu Dias who rounded the Cape of Good Hope), Gil Eanes, Lançarote de Freitas, Estevan Alfonso and Rodrigo Alvarez, who provisioned a squadron of six caravels to travel to isle of Garças in 1444, but returned with 150 Africans.

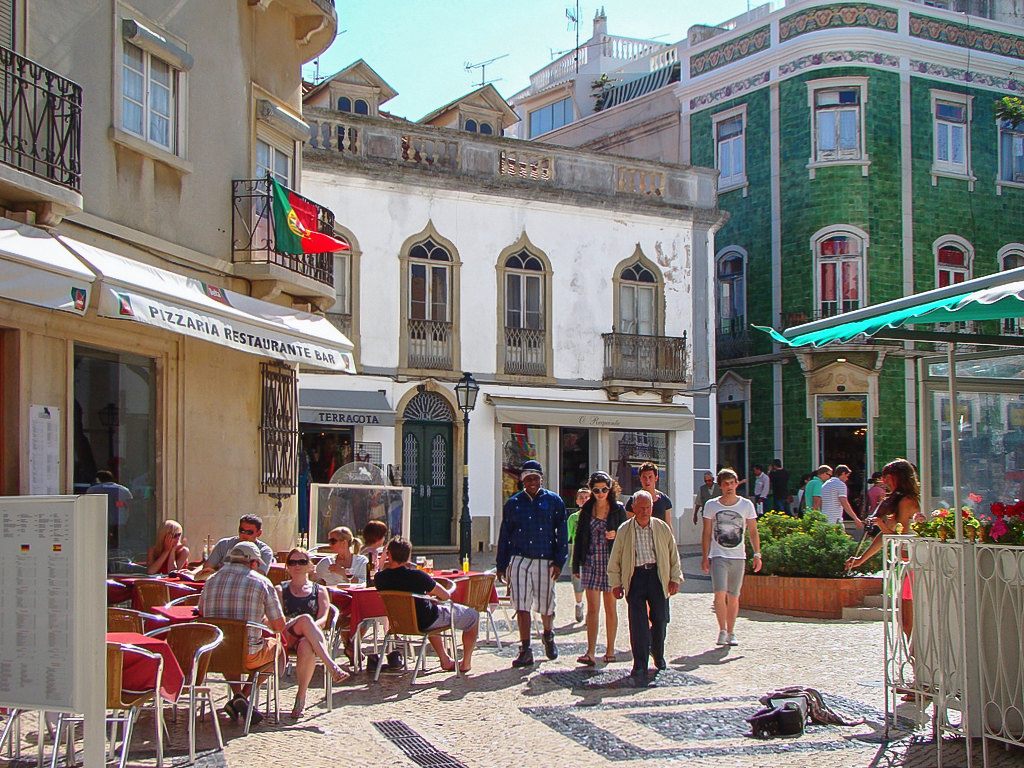
The historic centre of Lagos

Following the death of Prince Henry, and the expansion into the Atlantic and New World, the port of Lagos continued to receive shipments of goods and slaves, but its role began to decrease. Lisbon began to prosper, with ships returning directly from the colonies of the Azores, Madeira and Brazil, while trading houses began to relocate to the capital. But, even as the wealth arrived in Lisbon and Lagos, the ostentation was widely on display in the royal residences.

King Sebastian, obsessed with his plans for a great crusade against the Kingdom of Fez, assembled a huge fleet in Lagos in 1578. During this ill-fated attempt he and most of Portugal's nobility were killed in the Battle of Ksar El Kebir in Morocco, eventually causing a succession crisis, that eventually resulted in the Iberian Union.

When Portugal came under Spanish rule, the Portuguese coast became a target for the English fleet. Lagos, close to the Spanish naval base of Cádiz, was attacked by Sir Francis Drake in the late 1580s, but was defended by its inhabitants, resulting in Drakes sack of Faro. But, the coast was under regular attack of other pirates and corsairs, in addition to the Spanish who bombarded the Algarve during the Portuguese Restoration War (1640–1668), which led to the construction of a string of forts all along the coast. One of them was the late-17th-century Fort of Ponta da Bandeira in Lagos, which was completed between 1679 and 1690 (according to the stone inscription over the main door).

From 1576 to 1755, Lagos was a high-profile capital of the Algarve, until the old Portuguese town was destroyed by the earthquake and tsunami of 1755. Although some walls from the 16th century still remain, as well as the governor's castle, many of the buildings are from the 17th century.

Two well-known naval battles took place off Lagos, reflecting its strategic location: in the 1693 Battle of Lagos a French flotilla defeated a combined Anglo-Dutch force, while in the 1759 Battle of Lagos a British force defeated a French force.

== Geography ==
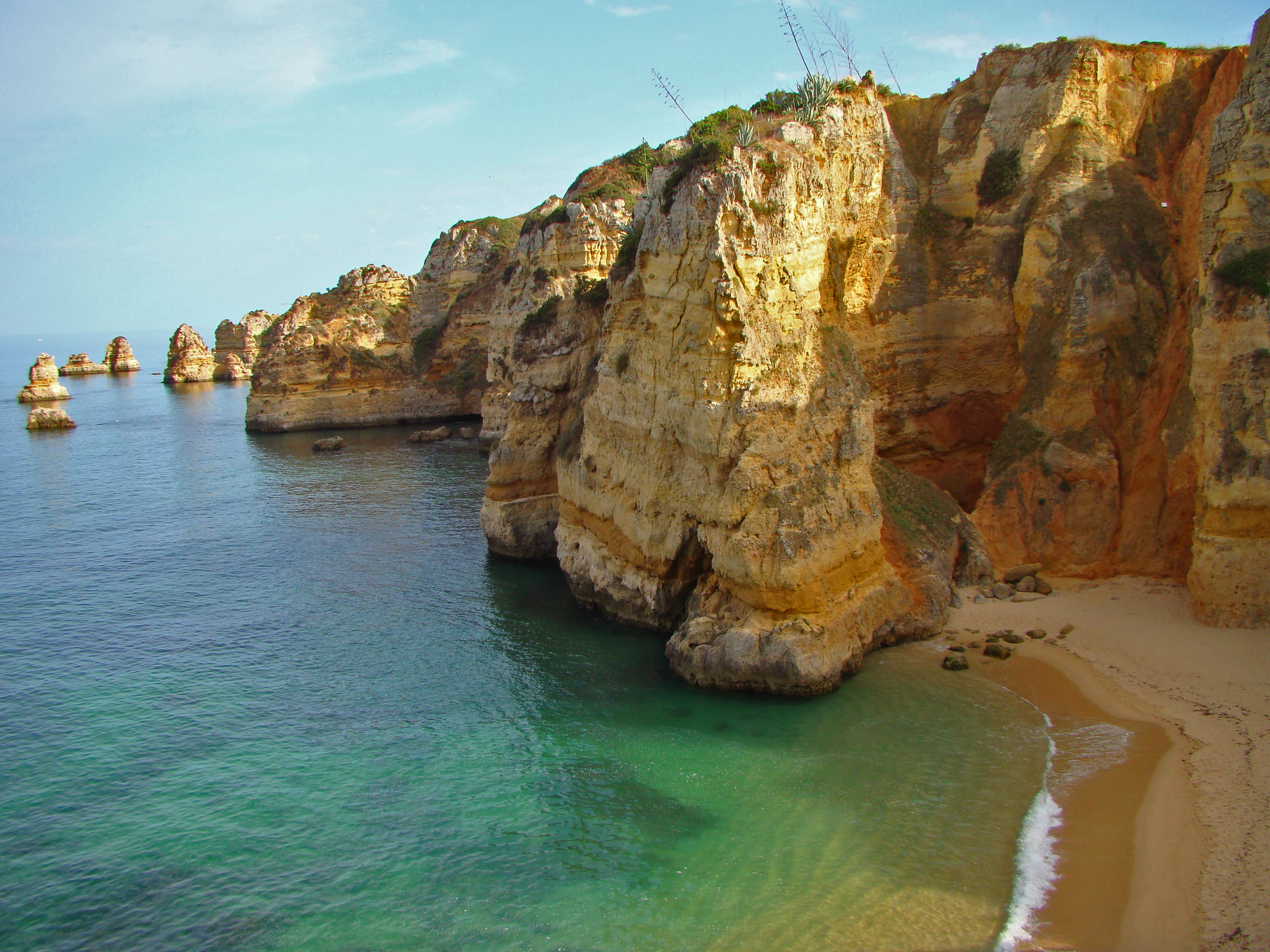
Dona Ana Beach (Praia Dona Ana)

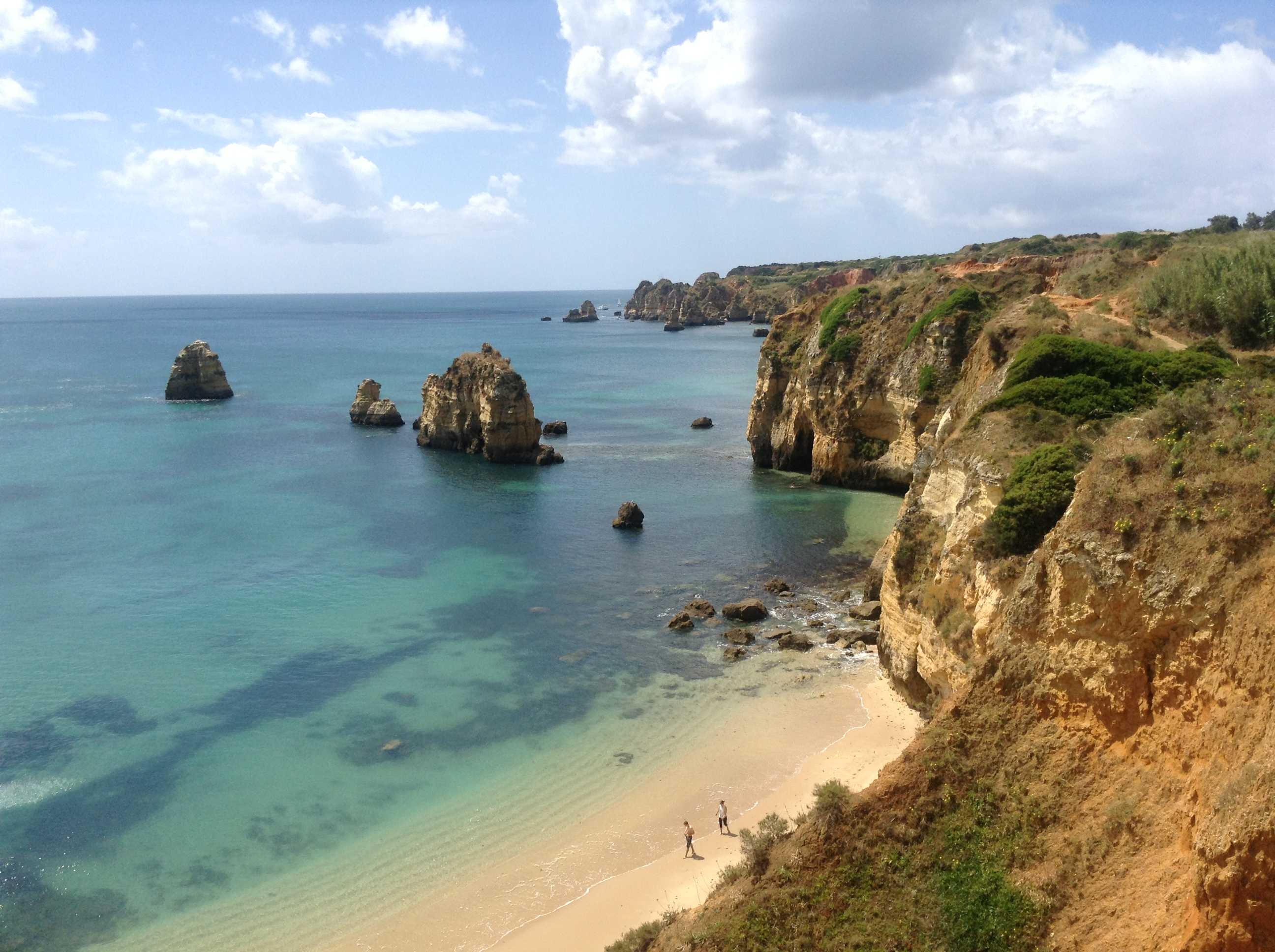
Pinhão beach

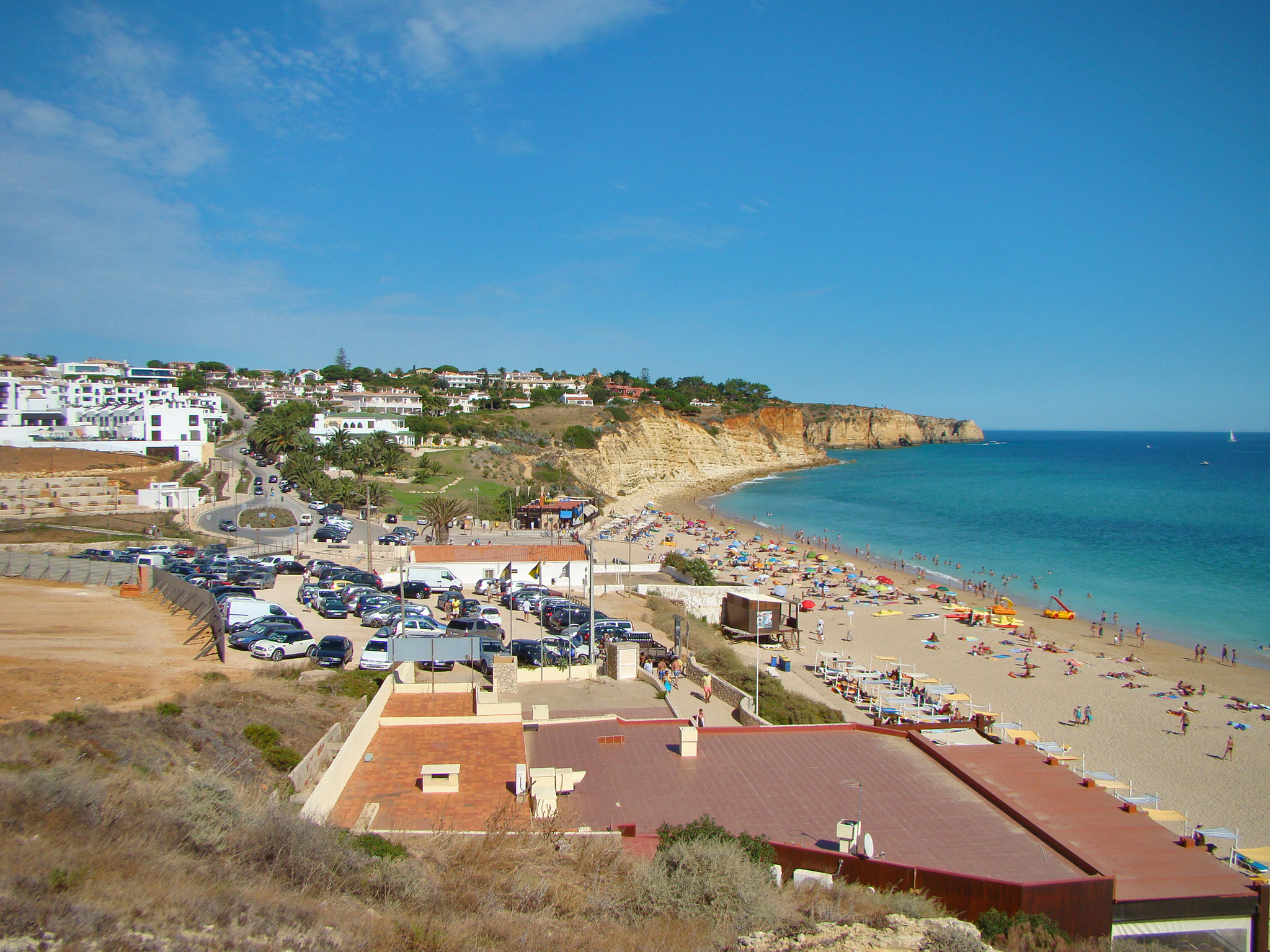
Porto de Mós beach (Praia do Porto de Mós) is one of the most popular beaches in Lagos, along with Dona Ana and Meia Praia

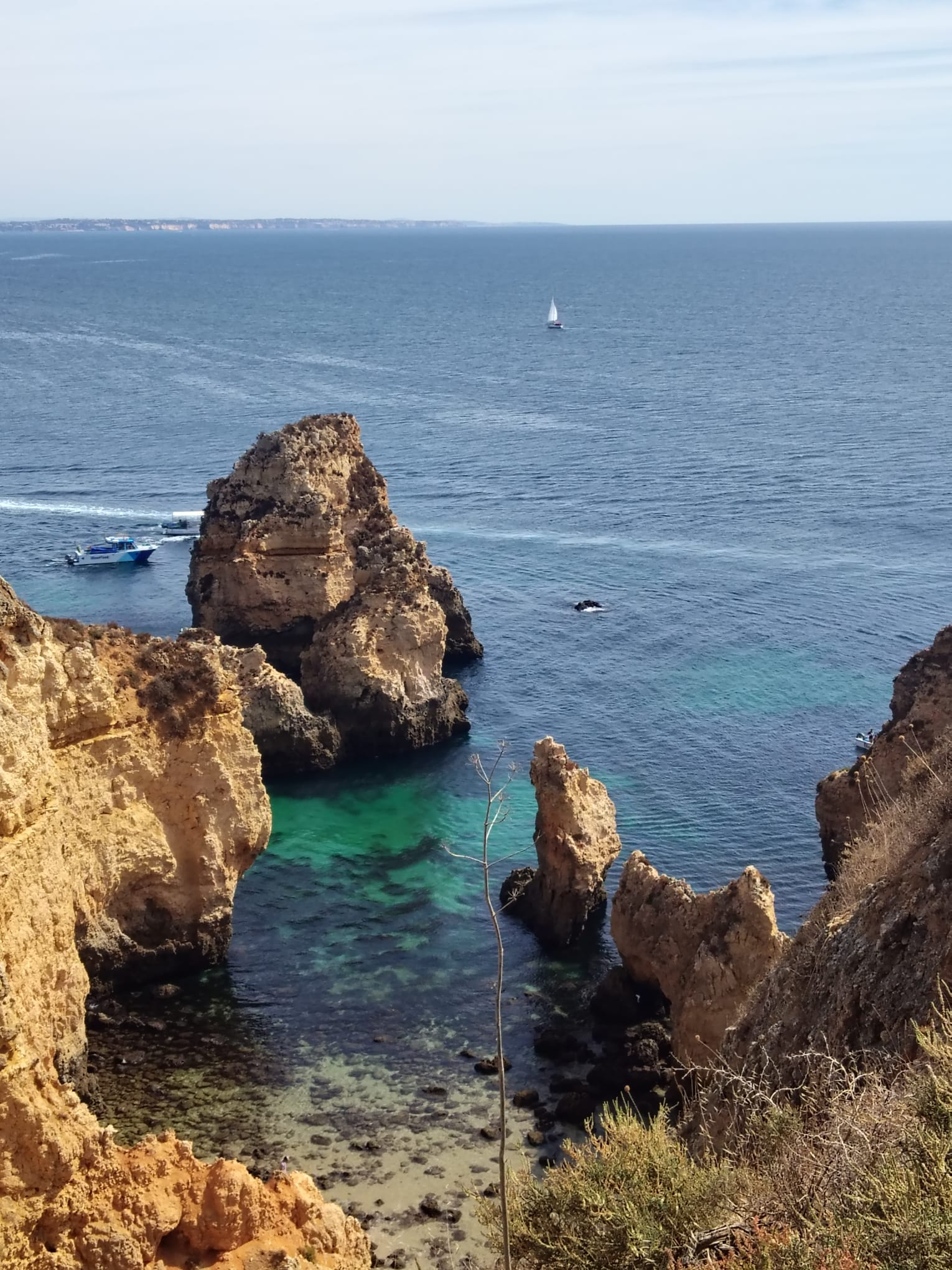
Lagos, Algrave, Portugal

=== Physical geography ===
By its geographical position (east-northeast to west-southwest orientation) and lithological diversity, the Algarve stands out as a unique stratigraphic and morpho-tectonic region. A peripheral Carboniferous unit of the Variscan orogeny, it constitutes the Mesozoic and Cenozoic sedimentary layers, deposited onto two totally distinct superimposed basins. Between the Middle-Upper Triassic to Hettangian, sediments evolved from continental (fluvial red sandstone) to shallow marine over the entire region, which included instances of evaporates, tholeiite fissural magmas, lava flows, volcanic ash and pyroclasts.

The area of Lagos, conforms to the Middle Miocene Lagos-Portimão formation (a band that extends along the coast from Lagos to Albufeira, abutting the Serra do Caldeirão to the north) and which corresponds to marine sedimentation over relatively stable, but a minorly deformed limestone shelf platform. A period of calm during the intra-Miocene (of approximately 2.4 Ma) led to generalized exposure and development of karst, that influences the present day coastline. The conspicuous horizontal bending of this profile in the cliffs of Lagos, much like the remainder of the Lagos-Portimão formation, is formed by alternating bands of siliciclastic and calcareous lithologies. The low degree of cementation in the layers causes a high degree of instability of the cliffs. The littoral and cliff sands are dominated by various bivalve organisms, bryozoans, larger benthic foraminifers and Coralline algae with minor additions of echinoids and balanids implying a shallow-water depositional system of a warm-temperate climatic regime. The locality of Cerro das Mós, from where a large crocodilian (Tomistoma schlegelii) tooth was collected long ago, has also produced some Odontoceti teeth. These may be dated from the Serravallian, which, constitute the oldest marine mammal occurrence in the Algarve.

=== Climate ===
Lagos has a Mediterranean climate (Köppen: Csa) with hot, dry summers and mild, wet winters. Like the rest of the Algarve, Lagos is very sunny, averaging over 3100 hours of sunshine a year. Precipitation is concentrated in the winter months, where highs average around 16–17 °C (61–63 °F) and lows around 8–9 °C (46–48 °F), wind and humidity are also more prevalent during this season, averaging 14 km/h (8.7 mph) of wind and around 80 percent humidity. Summers are warm to hot, very sunny and generally still, the coastal sea breeze helps to cool down the often excessive heat of this season.

Sea temperatures have little seasonal variation and are their highest in September-October and their lowest in March, averaging 20–21 °C (68–70 °F) in the summer, and 16–17 °C (61–63 °F) in the winter.

Climate data for Lagos, Portugal
Month	Jan	Feb	Mar	Apr	May	Jun	Jul	Aug	Sep	Oct	Nov	Dec	Year
Mean daily maximum °C (°F)	14.9 (58.8)	15.4 (59.7)	17.2 (63.0)	18.9 (66.0)	22.1 (71.8)	25.5 (77.9)	27.3 (81.1)	28.1 (82.6)	25.9 (78.6)	22.3 (72.1)	17.8 (64.0)	15.8 (60.4)	20.9 (69.7)
Daily mean °C (°F)	11.5 (52.7)	11.9 (53.4)	13.6 (56.5)	15.2 (59.4)	17.8 (64.0)	20.7 (69.3)	22.0 (71.6)	22.7 (72.9)	21.1 (70.0)	18.6 (65.5)	14.4 (57.9)	12.5 (54.5)	16.8 (62.3)
Mean daily minimum °C (°F)	8.5 (47.3)	8.8 (47.8)	10.4 (50.7)	11.9 (53.4)	14.0 (57.2)	16.6 (61.9)	17.6 (63.7)	18.3 (64.9)	17.4 (63.3)	15.4 (59.7)	11.5 (52.7)	9.7 (49.5)	13.3 (56.0)
Average precipitation mm (inches)	59 (2.3)	51 (2.0)	55 (2.2)	41 (1.6)	25 (1.0)	5 (0.2)	0 (0)	2 (0.1)	18 (0.7)	64 (2.5)	68 (2.7)	87 (3.4)	475 (18.7)
Mean monthly sunshine hours	158.7	168.7	202.4	264.7	319.9	337.1	382.8	356.3	265.2	219.8	174.9	168.3	3,018.8
Source 1: Climate-data.org
Source 2: Portuguese Environment Agency

=== Ecoregions/Protected areas ===
Lagos has many natural interest sites, including:

- Ponta da Piedade (English: Mercy Point)
- Grutas da Costa d'Oiro (English: Golden Coast Grottos)
- Laguna de Alvor (English: Lagoon of Alvor)
- "Bravura Dam" English: Bravura Dam)
- Mata Nacional de Barão de S.João (English: National Forest of the Baron of Saint John), representing a varied flora that includes Pine (Pinaceae), Acacia (Acacia), Eucalyptus (Eucalyptus) and Strawberry trees (Arbutus unedo), with six pedestrian trails and six campsites. In the zone of Pedra Branca, is a Paleolithic menhir, called the Menhir of Pedro do Galo, accessible through the pedestrian trails, visitors can use the tables and picnicking areas near the guardhouse for barbecues, while small children have access to a playground. A public sports field and 100 metre interval obstacle course was also constructed to attract activity, near the picnic area.
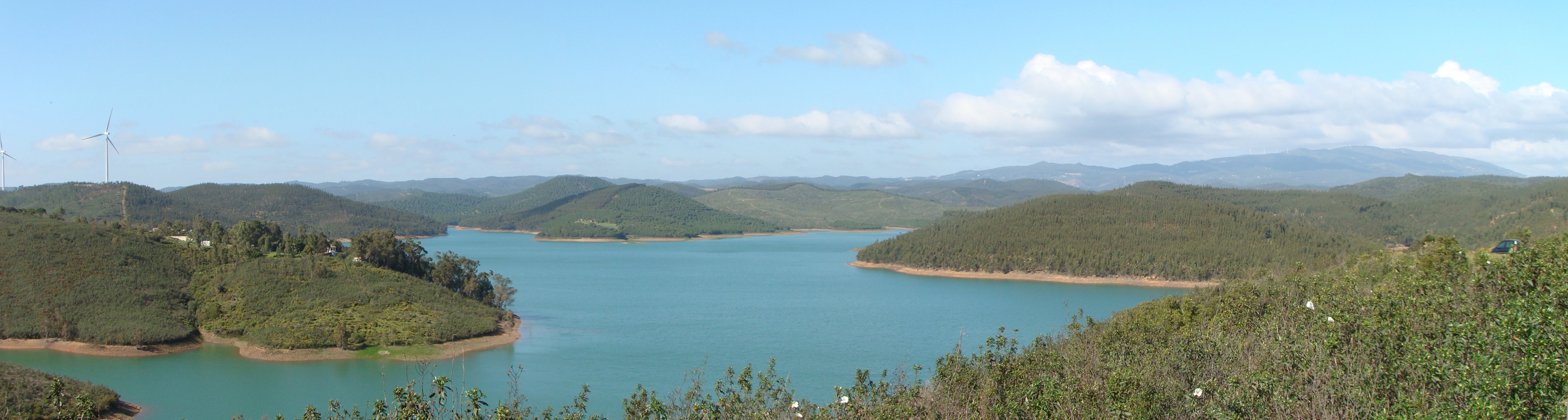
The Bravura Dam, in the parish of Bensafrim

==== Beaches ====
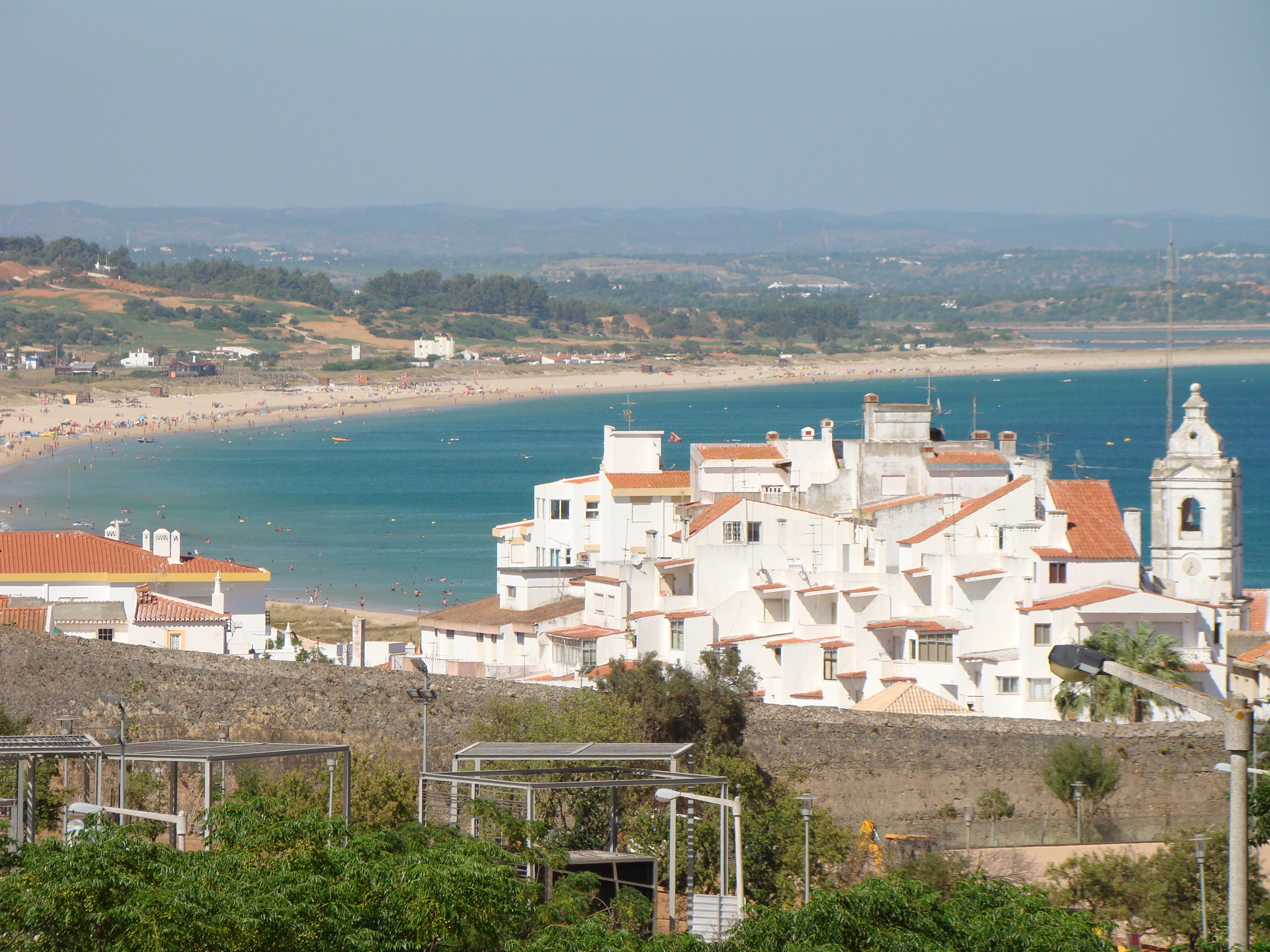
A view of Lagos and the Meia Praia beach in the background

- Meia Praia (Half Beach) —the most popular tourist beach, consisting of soft, white sand, Meia Praia is one of the largest open bays in Europe, resulting in calm seas, permitting conditions for many nautical sports, while cliffs provide sheltered coves from strong windy conditions;
- Praia Solaria (Sunny Beach);
- Praia da Batata (Potato Beach) — a small beach tucked between two small cliffs (where the river meets the Atlantic Ocean). It is known for the small music festivals that take place there during summer;
- Praia dos Estudantes (Students' Beach);
- Praia da Dona Ana (Dona Ana Beach) - its areal is slightly thicker than the beaches in the surrounding area and it is surrounded by striking rock formations. At high tide the beach is split by the geomorphology of the cliffs;
- Praia do Canavial (Canavial Beach);
- Praia de Camilo (Camilo Beach);
- Praia da Luz (Beach of Light) - located in the parish of Luz, the beach is bounded in the east by Rocha Negra (English: Black Rock), providing summer vacationers with a popular escape.
- Praia da Balança- located after Praia da Boneca and Praia dos Pinheiros, it is a sandy cove enclosed by towering cliffs.

== Demographics ==
The population of Lagos Municipality (an area of 212.99 km^{2}.) in the March 2021 census was registered as 33,494. It was estimated to be 35,241 by 31 December 2024. The city of Lagos proper (which includes only the civil parish of São Sebastião e Santa Maria, an area of 29.15 km²), recorded a population of approximately 23,648 (density 811.3/km²) in the 2021 census.

The population of the municipality in 2011 was 31,049,

Population of Lagos (1801 - 2011)
Year	Pop.	±%
1801	9,789	—
1849	11,012	+12.5%
1900	13,937	+26.6%
1930	16,210	+16.3%
1960	17,060	+5.2%
1981	19,700	+15.5%
1991	21,526	+9.3%
2001	25,398	+18.0%
2009	29,298	+15.4%
2011	30,755	+5.0%
2021	33,494	+8.9%

In 2012 Lagos received the QualityCoast Gold Award for its efforts to become a sustainable tourism destination. Because of this award, Lagos was selected for inclusion in the global atlas for sustainable tourism DestiNet.

== Human geography ==
The municipality of Lagos is located approximately 35 kilometres (22 miles) east of the Cape St. Vincent coast, along the southern coast of the Algarve. It is surrounded along its borders by the municipalities of Vila do Bispo (to the west), Aljezur (to the northwest), Monchique (to the northeast) and Portimão (to the east).

To the north of Lagos is the road to Silves, the first capital of the Algarve, Monchique (spa town/mountain), Milfontes, a coastal town and port/harbour of the city of Sines, that winds through the scenic protected landscape of the Southwest Natural Park (Costa Sudoeste Alentejana e Vicentina).

Administratively, the municipality is divided into four civil parishes (freguesias):

- Bensafrim e Barão de São João
- São Gonçalo de Lagos (São Sebastião e Santa Maria)
- Luz, which includes the separate villages of Almádena and Espiche.
- Odiáxere

=== Twin towns — sister cities ===
Lagos is twinned with:

- Torres Vedras, district of Lisbon, Portugal
- Ribeira Grande, island of São Miguel, Azores
- Ribeira Grande de Santiago, island of Santiago, Cape Verde
- Palos de la Frontera, autonomous community of Andalusia, Spain
- Ksar El Kebir, city in the province of Larache, Morocco
- Sassenheim, town in the province of South Holland, Netherlands
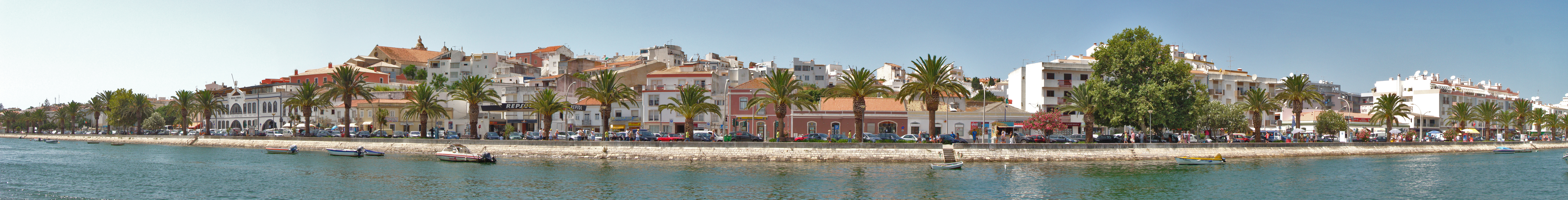
Panoramic view of Lagos's Avenida dos Descobrimentos

== Transportation ==
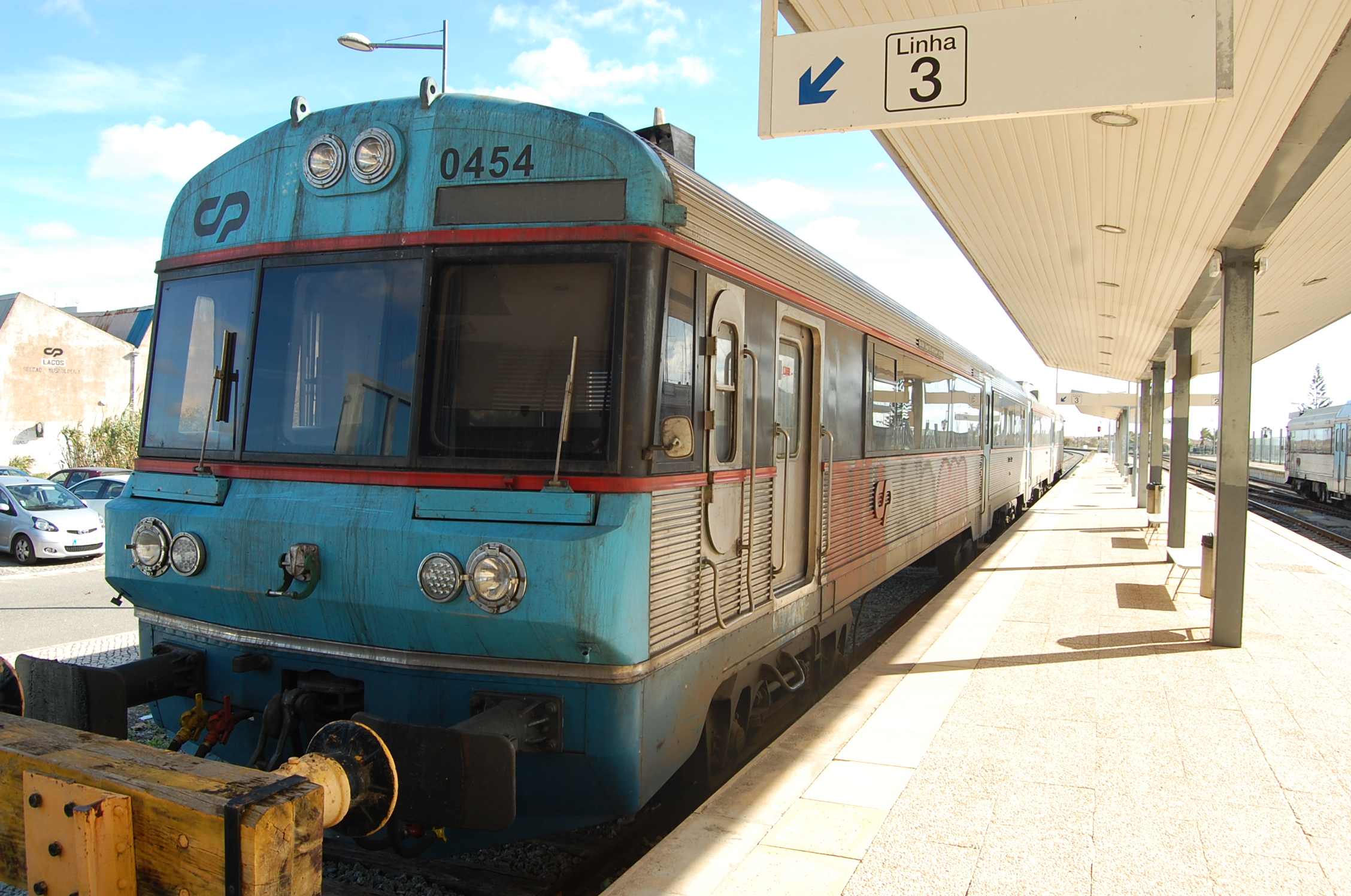
A CP train at Lagos station

Lagos railway station is the western terminus of the Linha do Algarve railway line, which connects Lagos to Vila Real de Santo António (via Faro and Tavira). The passenger train service is operated by Comboios de Portugal (CP).

== Architecture ==
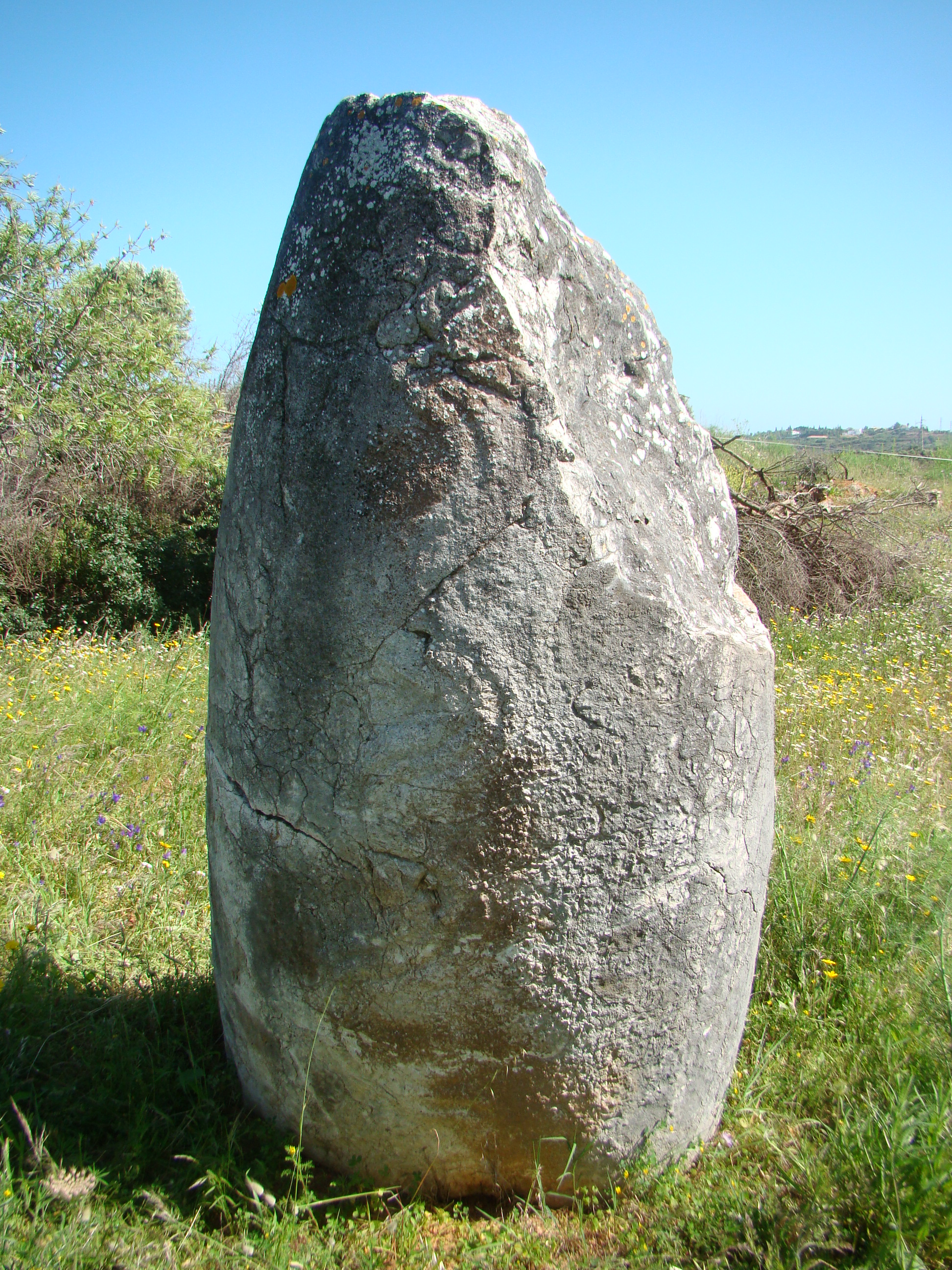
The obelisk-like Menir of Cabeça do Rochedo, representing the Neolithic history of the settlements of Lagos

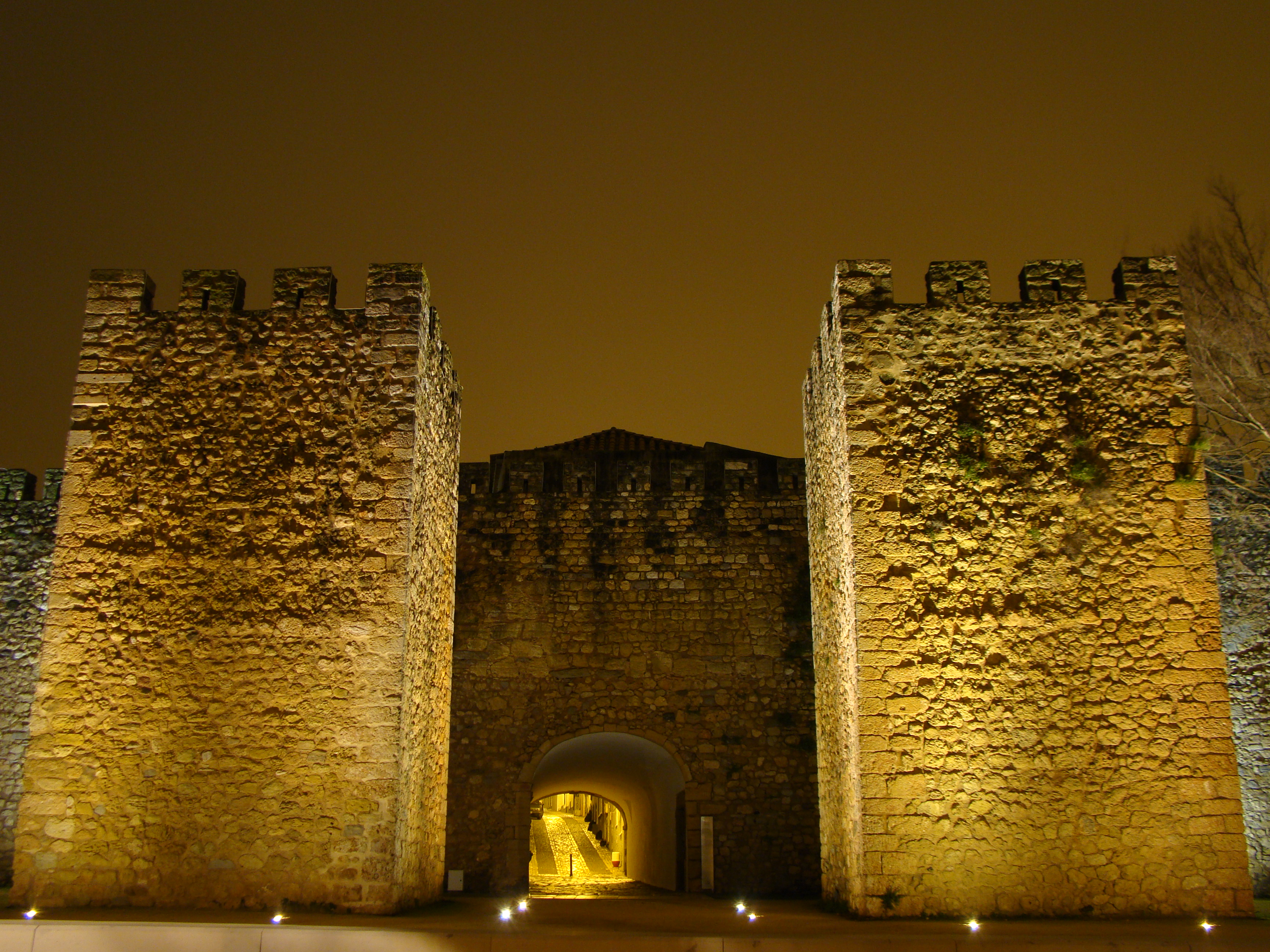
The walls of the old city of Lagos, that extended around the old quarter encircling the central part of Santa Maria and São Sebastião

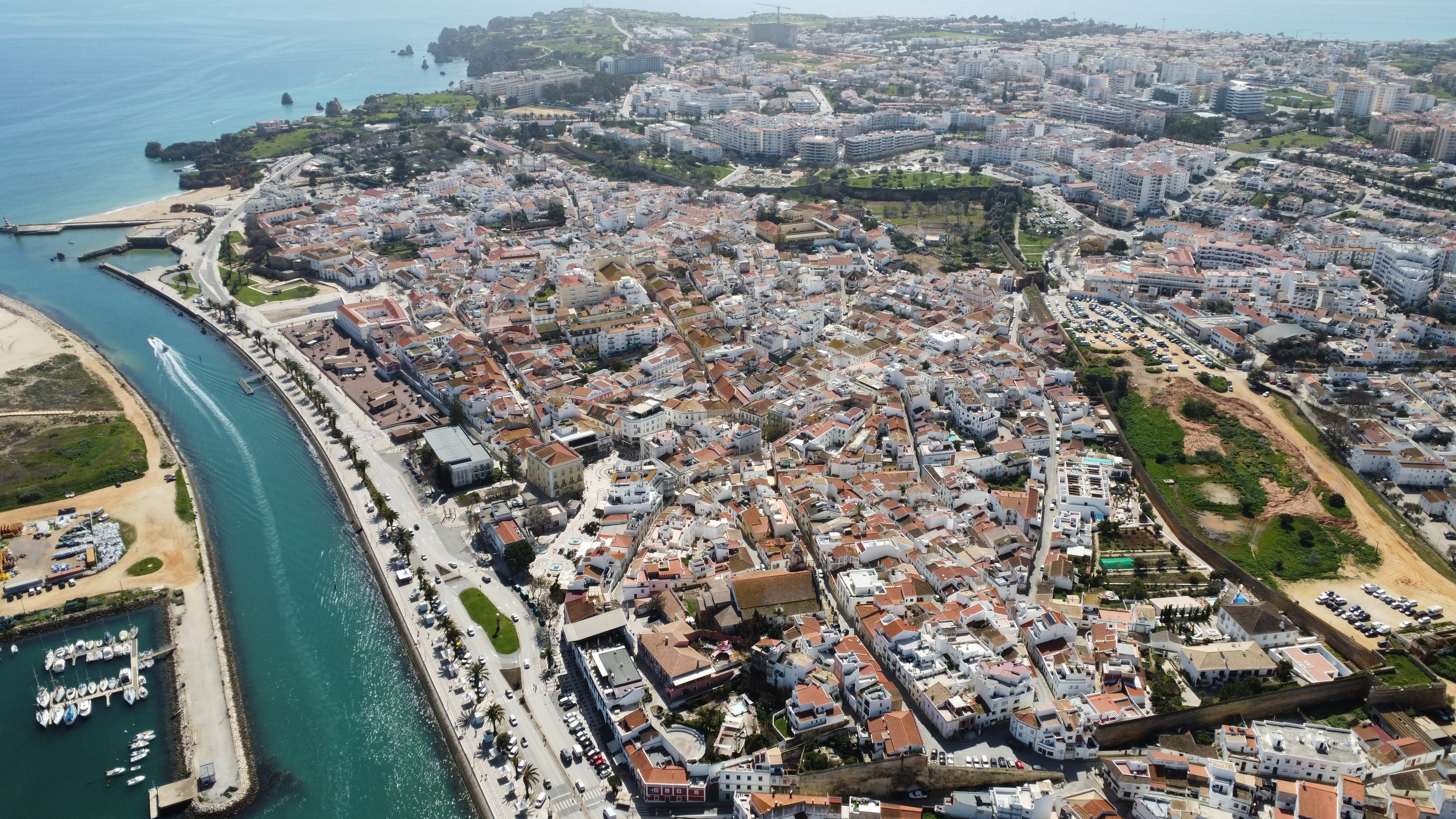
Aerial view of Lagos

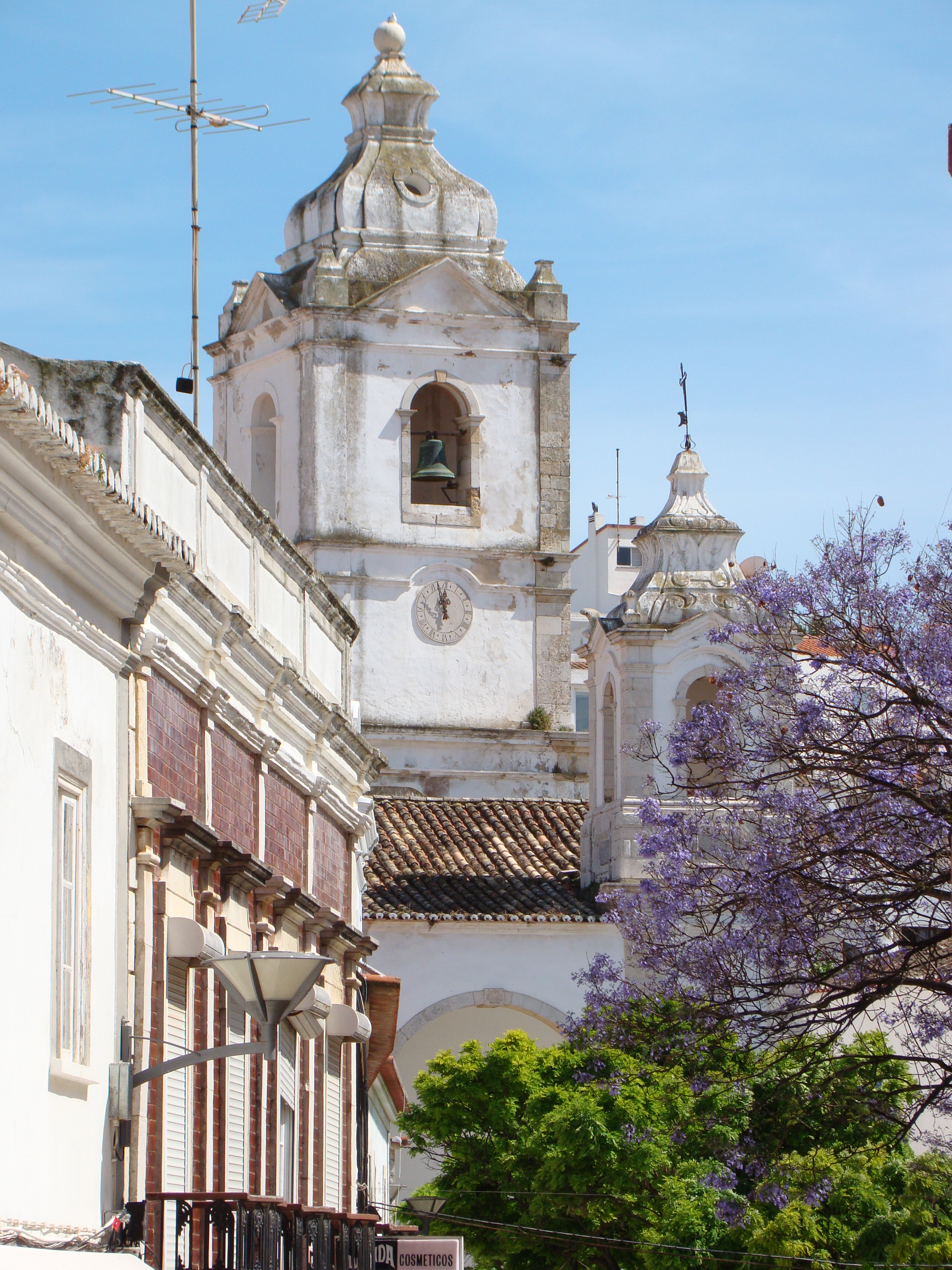
The two towers of Santo António's Church, which also has a museum inside

=== Prehistoric ===
- Menir da Cabeça do Rochedo (Portuguese: Menir da Cabeço do Rocheado)

=== Civic ===
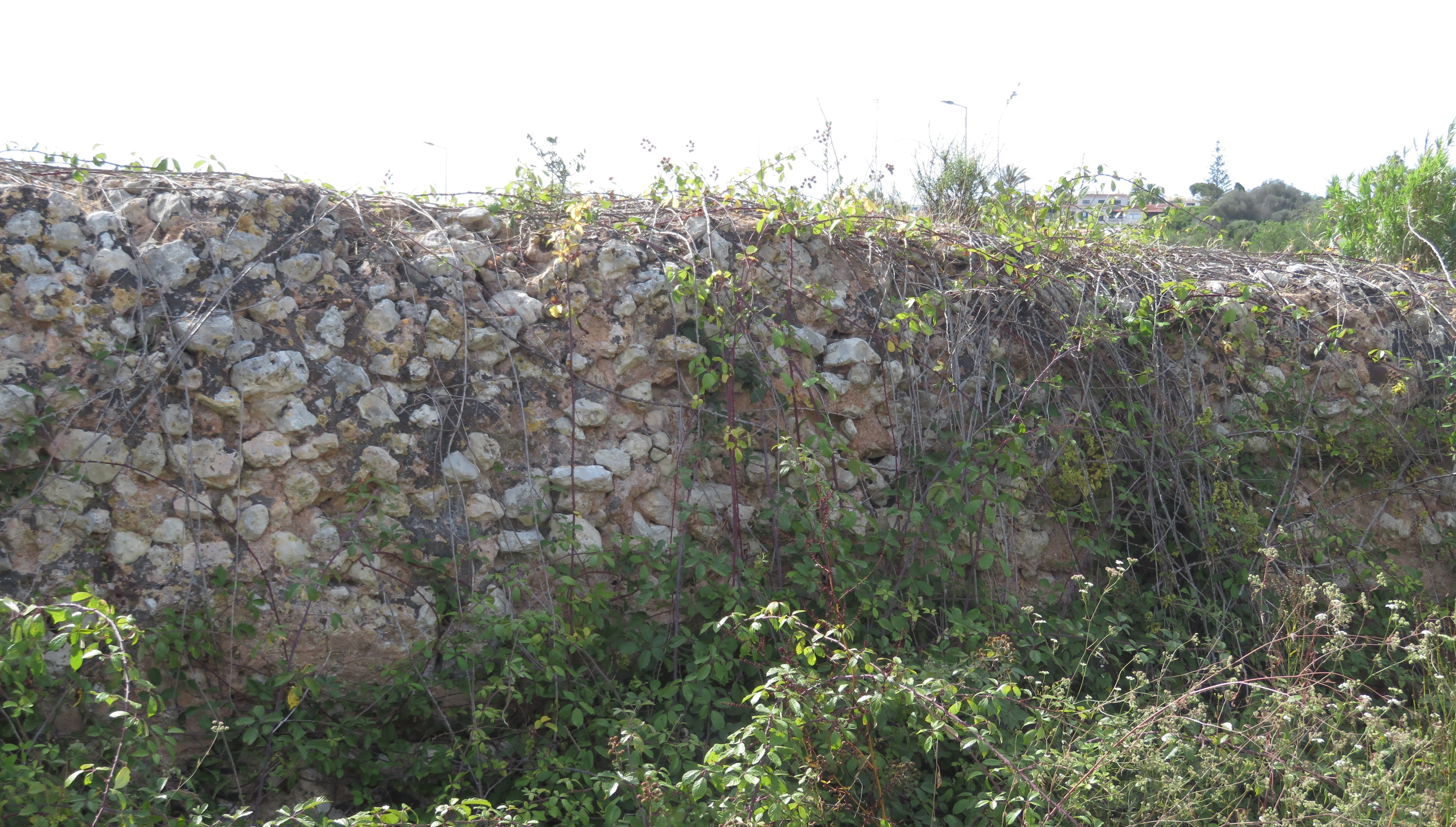
Roman dam

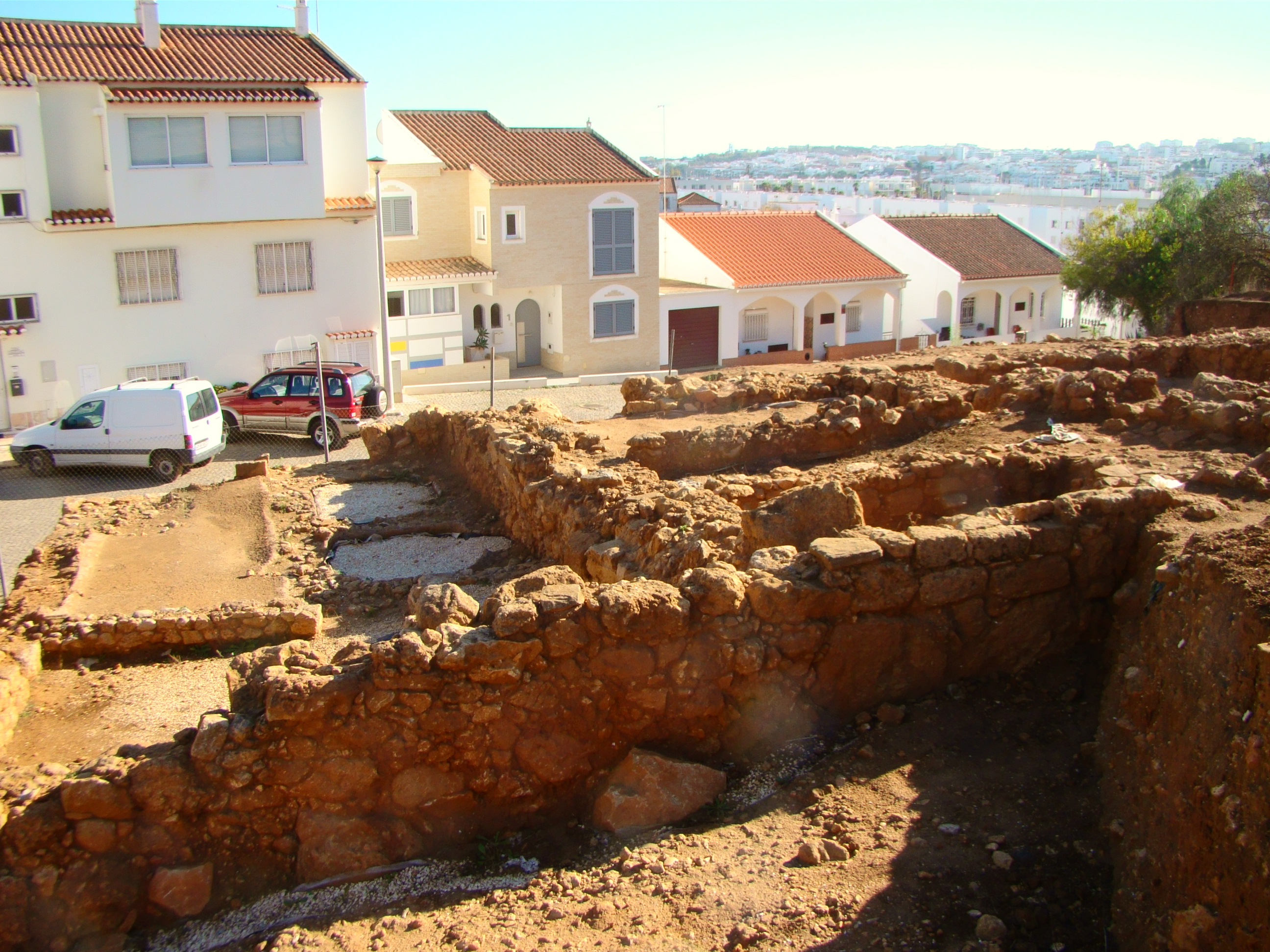
Excavations on Monte Molião

- Barracks of the Guarda Fiscal of Lagos (Portuguese: Quartel e Posto da Guarda Fiscal)
- Building of the Caixa Geral de Depósitos (Portuguese: Edifício da Caixa Geral de Depositos)
- Building of the Correios, Telégrafos e Telefonos (Portuguese: Edifício dos Correios, Telégrafos e Telefones de Lagos)
- Building of the Portagem (Portuguese: Edifício Antigo da Portagem)
- District Courthouse/Palace of Justice (Portuguese: Tribunal da Comarca/Palácio da Justiça)
- District Jailhouse of Lagos/Cultural Centre of Lagos (Portuguese: Cadeia Comarcã de Lagos/Centro Cultural)
- D. Maria Bridge (Portuguese: Ponte Dona Maria)
- Fonte Coberta Dam (Portuguese: Barragem da Fonte Coberta) is a dam measuring 36 metres in length with a height between 2.3 and 1.3 metres built by the Romans. It can be visited in the northwestern part of Lagos.
- Excavations in the northeast of Lagos on Monte Molião (Portuguese: Sítio Arquelógico do Molião) revealed the foundations and walls of a settlement founded in the 4th or 3rd century BC during the Iron Age.
- Gil Eanes Secondary/Commercial-Industrial School (Portuguese: Escola Industrial e Comercial de Lagos/Escola Secundária Gil Eanes)
- Hotel Tivolli Lagos (Portuguese: Hotel de Lagos)
- Municipal Hall of Lagos (Portuguese: Edifício dos Paços do Concelho)
- Lighthouse of Ponta da Piedade (Portuguese: Farol da Ponta da Piedade)
- Pillory of Lagos (Portuguese: Pelourinho de Lagos)
- Regional Museum of Lagos (Portuguese: Museu Regional de Lagos) - this modest regional museum is located next to the church of Santo António., housing the eclectic collection of archaeological finds from prehistory and the Neolithic, in addition to minerals, Roman mosaics, Moorish oil-lamps and pottery. The ethnographic section includes exhibits from life in the Algarve, that includes not only residential, but also military artefacts, such as swords, muskets and cannonballs, and the foral (charter) issued by King Manuel for Lagos. Religious artefacts are also prominent in the displays, that include the sacerdotal vestments worn by the canons who said Holy Mass to King Sebastian (before he left on his ill-fated conquest of Morocco), and a diptych (dating from the 16th century) with scenes from the Annunciation and Presentation of Jesus at the Temple.
- Slave Market/Customshoues of Lagos (Portuguese: Mercado de Escravos/Vedoria/Alfândega de Lagos)

=== Military ===
- Bulwark of Alcaria/Freiras (Portuguese: Baluarte da Alcaria/das Freiras)
- Bulwark of Porta dos Quartos (Portuguese: Baluarte da Porta dos Quartos)
- Bulwark of Santa Maria/Porta da Vila (Portuguese: Baluarte de Santa Maria/da Porta da Vila)
- Bulwark of São Francisco/Jogo da Bola (Portuguese: Baluarte de São Francisco/do Jogo da Bola)
- Castle of Senhora da Luz (Portuguese: Castelo da Senhora da Luz)
- Fort of Meia Praia (Portuguese: Forte da Meia Praia)
- Fort of Ponta da Bandeira (Portuguese: Forte da Ponta da Bandeira) - also known as the Forte do Pau da Bandeira, the Forte de Nossa Senhora da Penha de França or the Forte do Registo, the fort, which guarded the entrance to the harbour, was originally dedicated to the Santa Virgem Senhora da Penha de França (to which it was referred). This squat rectangular fort guards the entrance to the harbour, accessed by a small drawbridge, to terraced spaces (that overlook the town, beach and harbour) and the small chapel (decorated with 17th-century azulejos tile). Until the late 20th century, the fort was used as a service depot for military forces and housed services linked to maritime activities (such as supplies for lifeboats and nautical sports). It was restored between 1958 and 1960, and officially acquired by the municipality of Lagos in 1983, where it was converted into exhibition displays of maritime history, with astrolabes and models of caravels.
- Fort of Pinhão (Portuguese: Forte do Pinhão)
- Military Barracks of Lagos (Portuguese: Edifício Militar em Lagos/Trem de Artilharia)
- Musketeers' Workshop/Warehouse and Saddlery (Portuguese: Edifício Oficina do Espingardeiro/Armazém do Espingardeiro/Selaria)
- Regimental Warehouse/Church of São Brás (Portuguese: Armazém Regimental e Desparecido Igreja de São Brás)
- Tower of Atalaia (Portuguese: Torre da Atalaia)
- Walled/Tower Fortifications of Lagos (Portuguese: Muralhas e Torreões de Lagos)

=== Religious ===
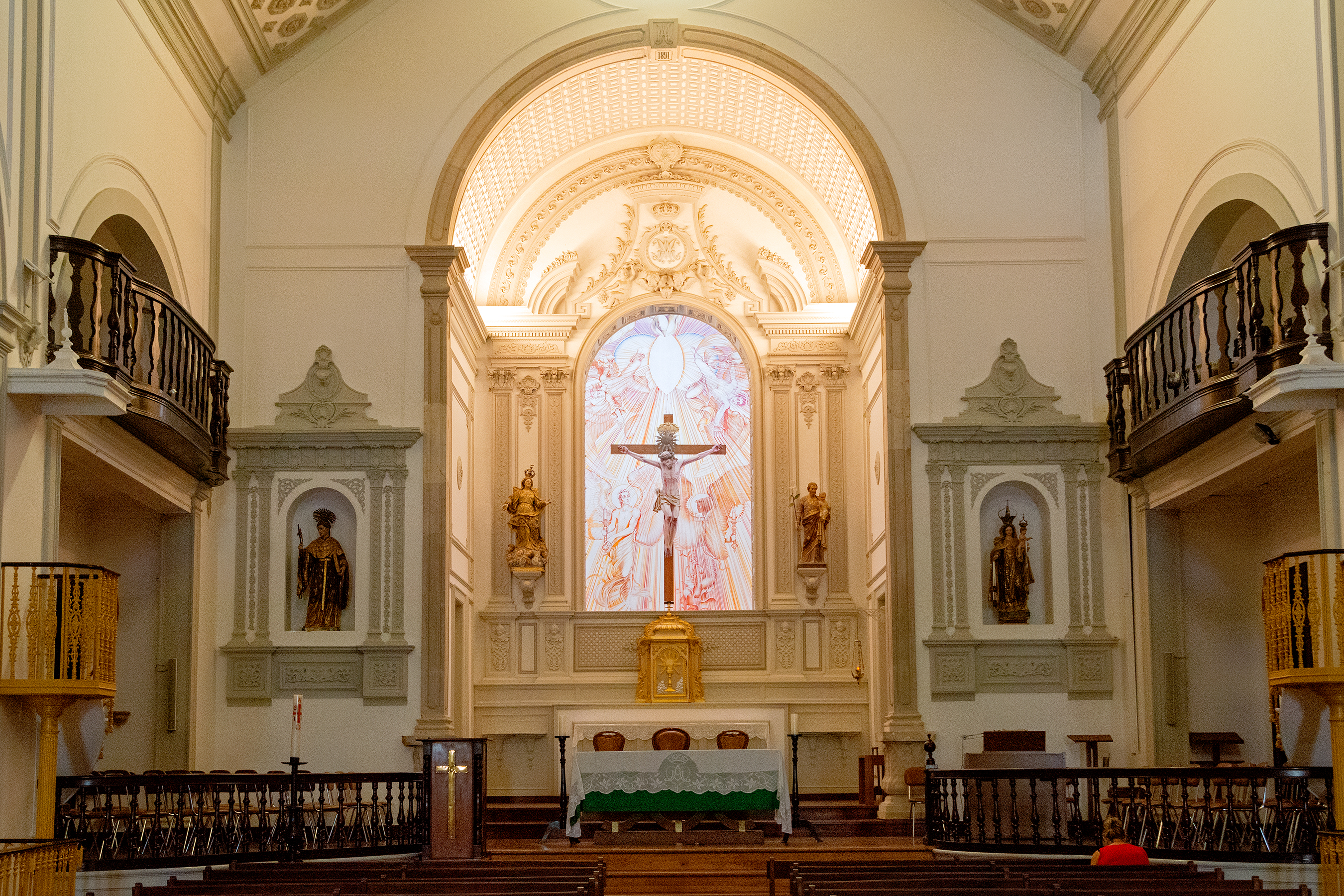
Altar area; Igreja de Santa Maria, September 2019

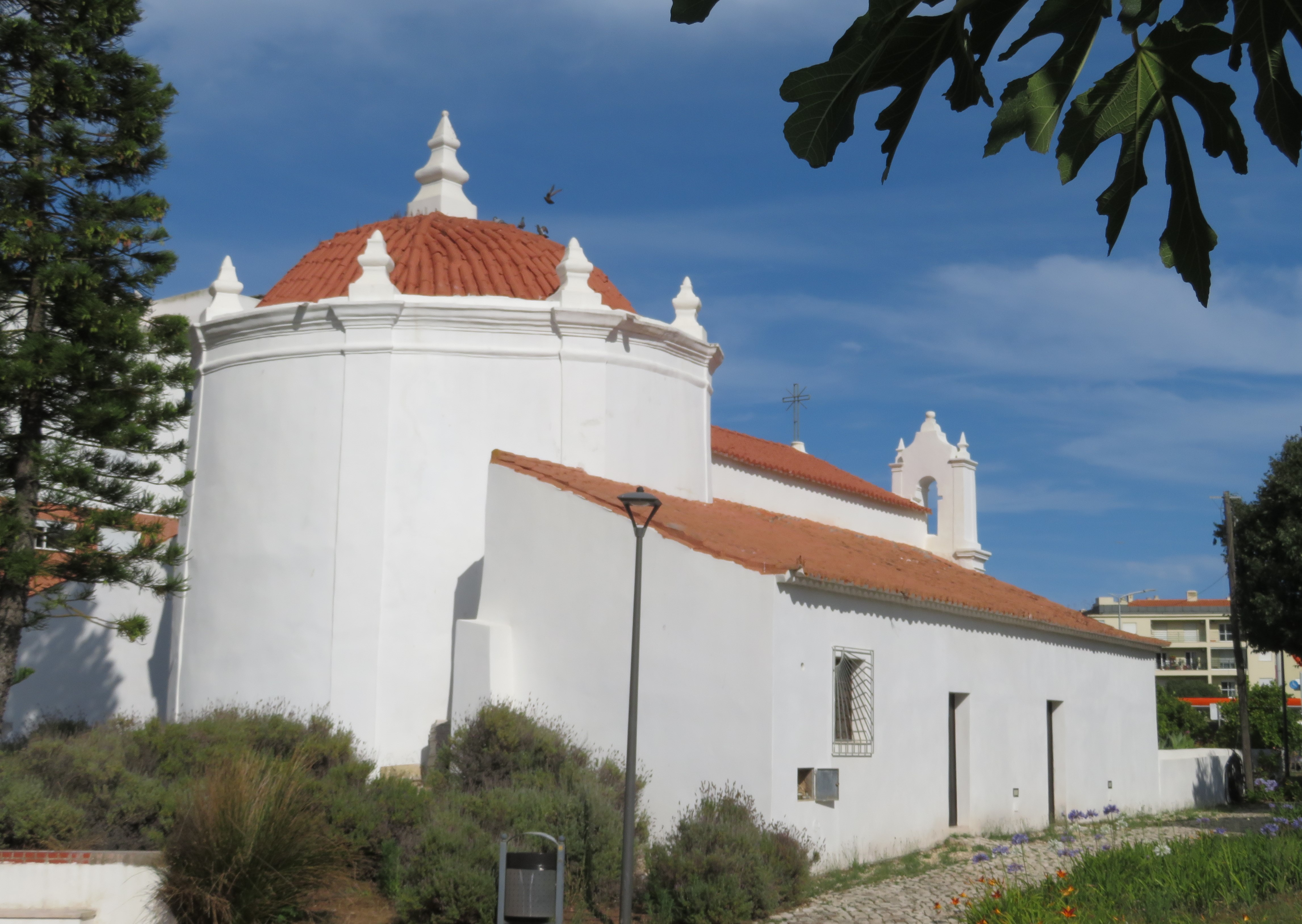
Capela de São João Baptista

- Chapel/Hermitage of São João Baptista (Portuguese: Capela/Ermida de São João Baptista) Its octagonal nave may have been built on the foundations of a mausoleum of a muslim Marabout in the 12th century. The oldest document in which the chapel and its monastery were mentioned dates from the 14th century. The chapel was nearly completely destroyed by the tsunami following the earthquake of 1755. Its reconstruction did not start before 1805. The monastery was dissolved in the 20th century and transformed into a normal residential building. Behind the chapel a large wall painting consisting of painted azulejo tiles is worth a visit. It shows people washing clothes in flat tanks behind the chapel. The tanks still exist today and can be visited behind the chapel.
- Church of Nossa Senhora do Carmo (Portuguese: Igreja da Nossa Senhora do Carmo)
- Church of Nossa Senhora da Luz (Portuguese: Igreja da Nossa Senhora da Luz)
- Church of Odiáxere (Portuguese: Igreja de Odiáxere)
- Church of Santa Maria (Portuguese: Igreja de Santa Maria/da Misericórdia)
- Church of Santo António (Portuguese: Igreja de Santo António) - its simple façade with the asymmetrical bell towers, date from 1715, and contrast sharply with the extravagantly decorated interior, which is covered in gilded wood carvings and blue-and-white 18th-century azulejo tiles (talha dourada) which fill the walls of the nave, while six Baroque paintings by José Joaquim Rasquinho, representing the miracles of Saint Anthony are hung on its walls. The wooden vault was painted with a trompe-l'œil effect, while polychrome statues of cherubs playing with animals and fishes are scattered within the interior. It was one of the few buildings to survive the Great Earthquake of 1755, reconstructed by the local commander of Regimental Infantry, who may have added the polychromatic statue of St. Anthony with military sash. Purportedly, King Sebastian attended his last mass in this church, before his ill-fated expedition to Morocco.* Convent of Nossa Senhora do Loreto (Portuguese: Convento de Nossa Senhora do Loreto)
- Church of São Sebastião (Portuguese: Igreja de São Sebastião/de Nossa Senhora da Conceição) - You can visit a small chapel of bones located in an annex of the church, visible from the outside at the back on the right, displaying human remains.
- Hermitage of São Pedro de Pulgão/Nossa Senhora dos Aflitos (Portuguese: Ermida de São Pedro do Pulgão/Nossa Senhora dos Aflitos)
- Ruins of the Hermitage of Santo Amaro (Portuguese: Ruinas da Ermida de São Amaro)
- Ruins of the Convent of the Trinity (Portuguese: Ruinas do Antigo Convento da Trindade/dos Frades Trinos)

== Notable citizens ==
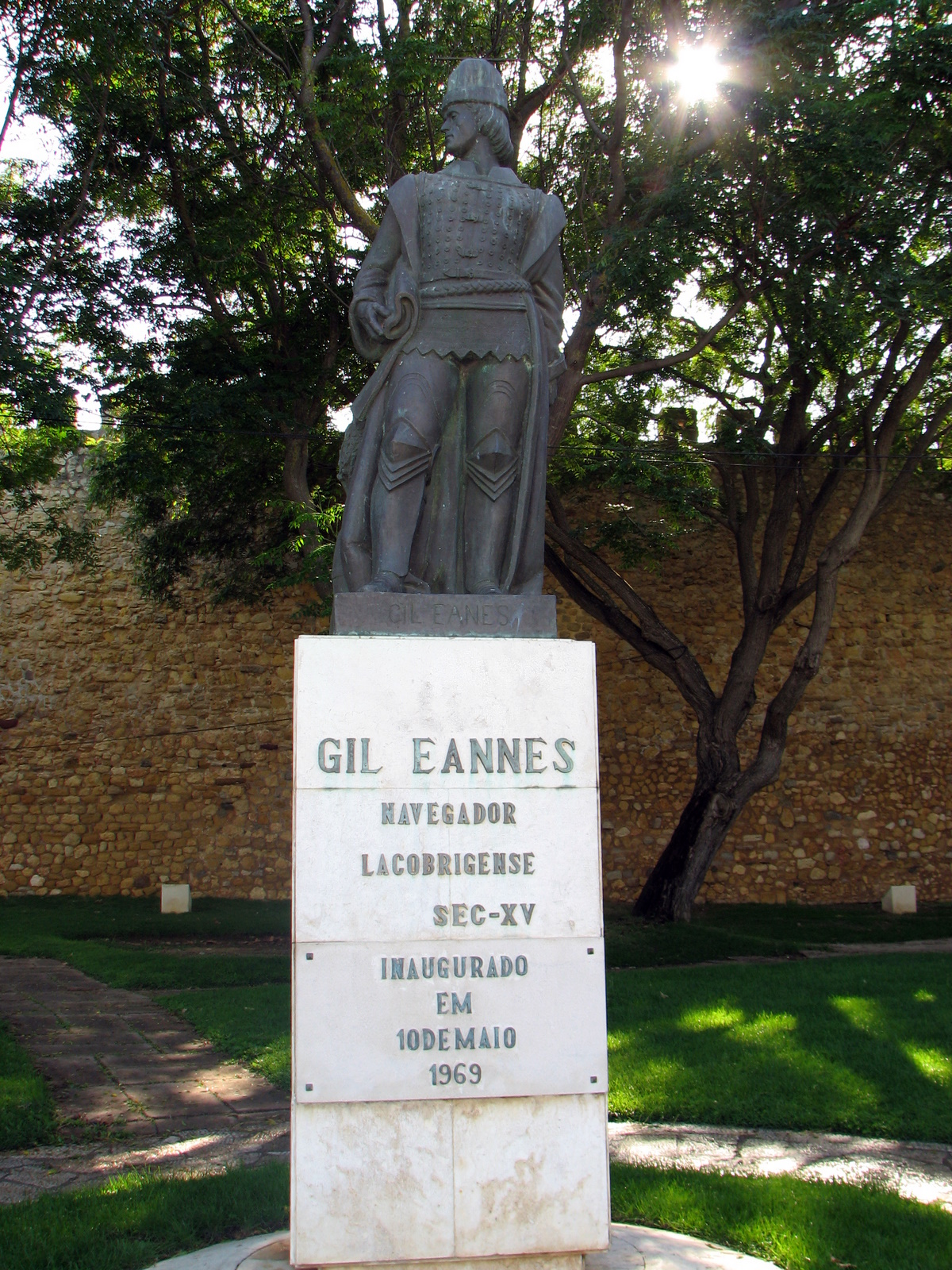
Gil Eannes statue in Lagos

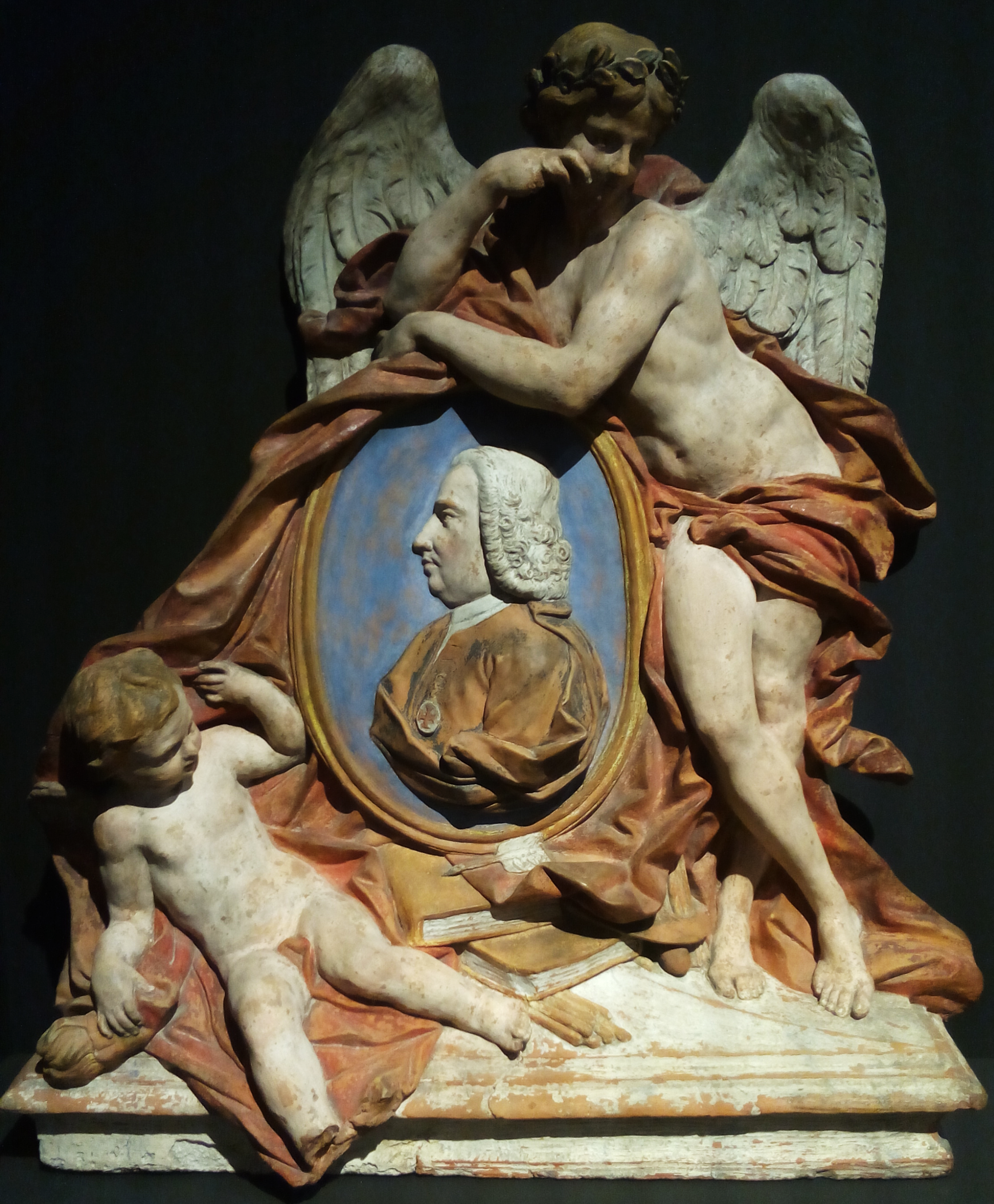
Funerary monument to Manuel Pereira de Sampaio

- Gundisalvus of Lagos (c.1370–1422), saint of the Order of Saint Augustine
- Soeiro da Costa (c.1390–c.1472), navigator and one of the Heroic Twelve of the Lusiadas
- Gil Eanes (1395–15thC), navigator and explorer of the 15th century
- Diogo Gomes (c.1420–c.1500), a Portuguese navigator, explorer and writer
- Pedro de Sintra (15thC), a Portuguese explorer of Sierra Leone around 1462
- Lançarote de Freitas (15thC), navigator and slave trader in the 15th century
- Diogo Rodrigues (c.1501–1577), navigator, captain, Governor of Salsette Island
- Gaspar Jorge de Leão Pereira (?? in Lagos –1576), the first Archbishop of Goa
- Manuel Pereira de Sampaio (1692–1750), a nobleman and diplomat at the Holy See in Rome
- José Sebastião de Almeida Neto (1841–1920), a Cardinal and Patriarch of Lisbon
- Júlio Dantas (1876–1962), doctor, poet, journalist, screenwriter, politician and diplomat
- José Reis, first Portuguese geriatric physician, founder of the Portuguese Geriatric and Gerontological Society in 1951
- Júlia Barroso (1930–1996), actress, singer and teacher

=== Sport ===
- Fernando Cabrita (1923–2014), a footballer with 351 club caps and manager
- Jamila Marreiros (b.1988), a football goalkeeper, 12 caps with Portugal women
- Diogo Viana (b.1990), a Portuguese professional footballer
