= São Gonçalo de Lagos =

- Civil parish
- Location in Portugal
- Coordinates: 37°06′55″N 8°40′59″W
- Country: Portugal
- Region: Algarve
- Intermunic. comm.: Algarve
- District: Faro
- Municipality: Lagos

Area
  - Total: 29.15 km^{2} (11.25 sq mi)

Population (2011)
  - Total: 23,671
  - Density: 812.0/km^{2} (2,103/sq mi)
- Time zone: UTC+00:00 (WET)
  - Summer (DST): UTC+01:00 (WEST)

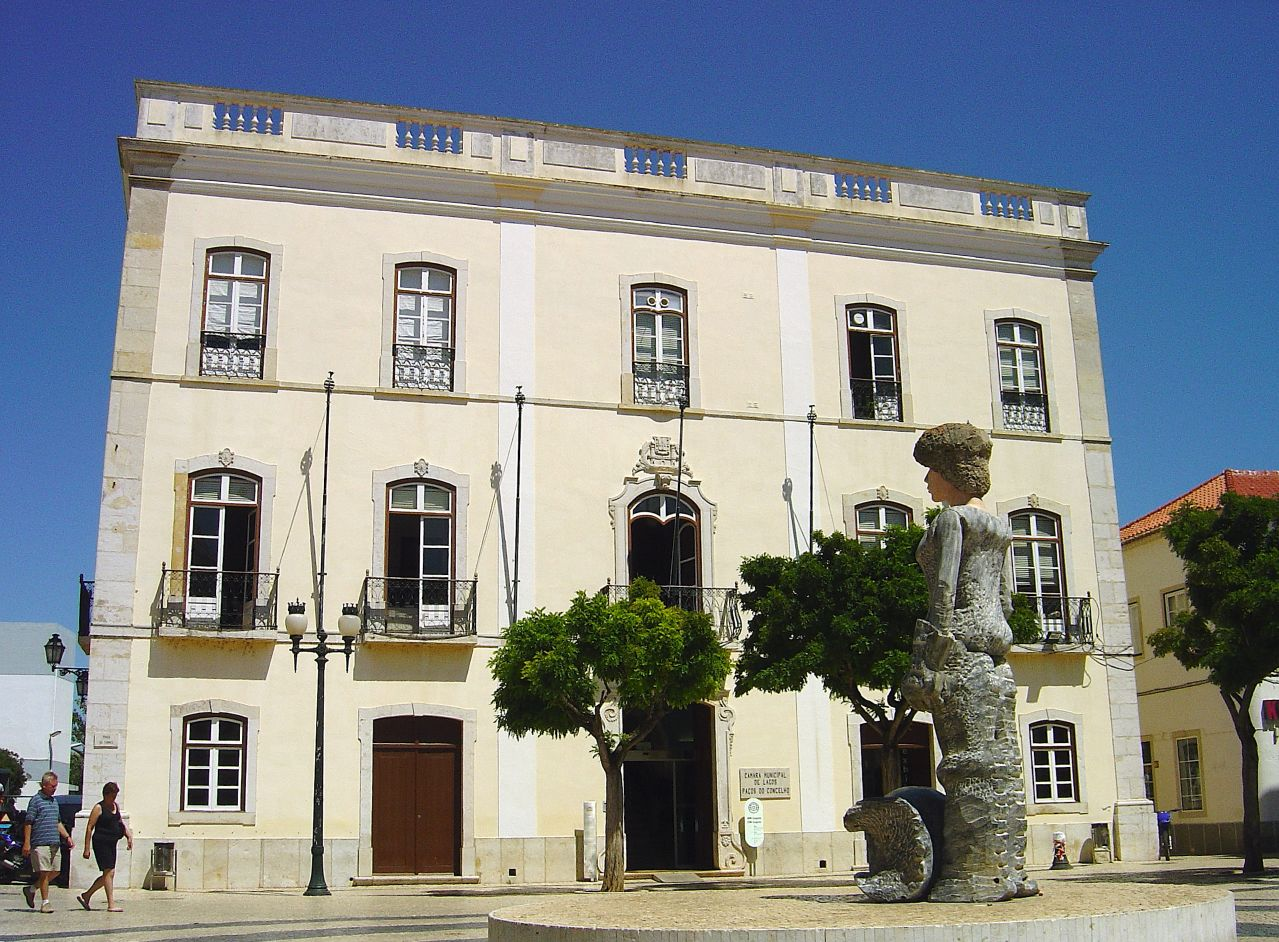
São Gonçalo de Lagos

São Gonçalo de Lagos is a civil parish in the municipality of Lagos, Portugal. It was formed in 2013 by the merger of the former parishes São Sebastião and Santa Maria. The population in 2021 was 23,671, up from 22,095 in 2011, in an area of 29.15 km^{2}.

== History ==
The parish was created under the name of União das Freguesias de Lagos (São Sebastião e Santa Maria) on 28 January 2013 by way of a resolution of the Assembly of the Republic promulgated on twelve days earlier with the union of the parishes of Santa Maria and São Sebastião, becoming its headquarters in the former parish of São Sebastião. This name was maintained until 26 August 2015, when it was given its current name in application of Law no. 108/2015 that modified its name.
