= Igreja de Santo António (Lagos) =

Church in Lagos, Faro District, Portugal

Coordinates: 37°05′58″N 8°40′17″W

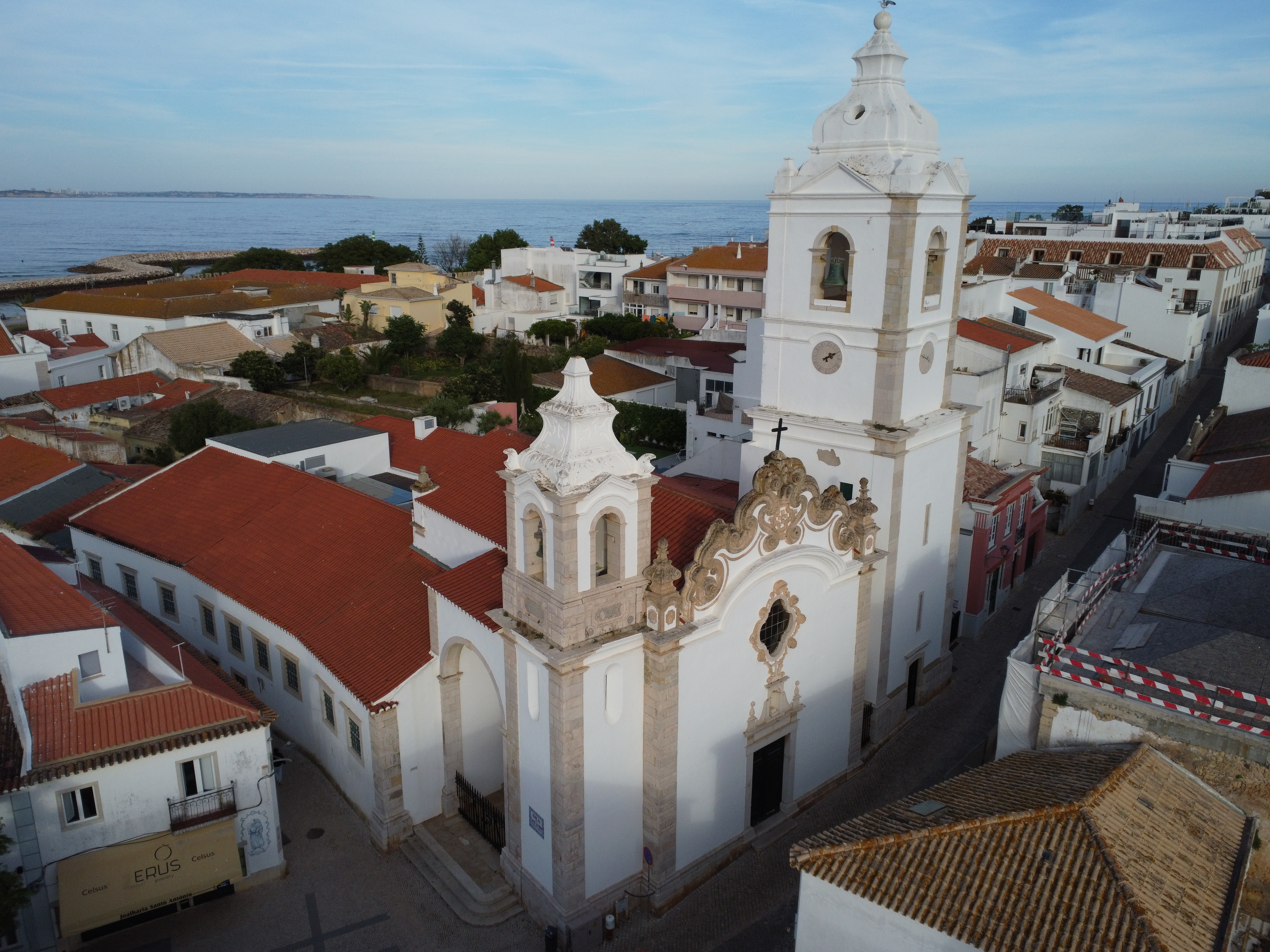
Igreja de Santo António

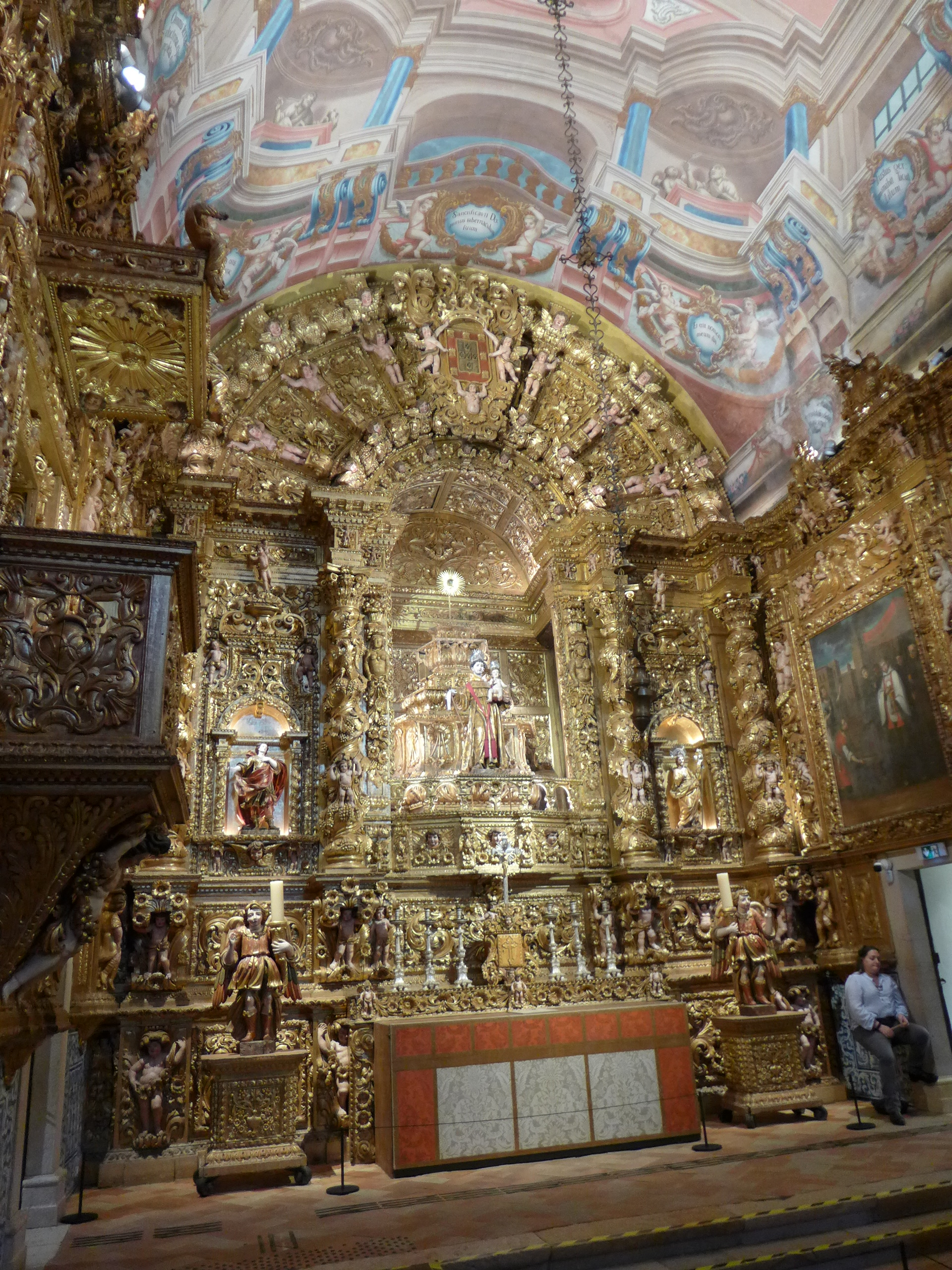

Igreja de Santo António is a church in Lagos, Portugal. It is classified as a National Monument. It is one of the main monuments in the city, being known for its interior richness in gilded carving. Attached to the church building is the Municipal Museum of Lagos. The church was commissioned by the military, and was completed in 1707. It was destroyed by the earthquake of 1755, and rebuilt in 1769 by order of the commander of the Lagos Infantry Regiment, Irish native Hugo Beaty, who was also administrator of the Confraternity of Saint Anthony. It was also on that date that the eight paintings with the miracles of Saint Anthony were produced. Inside the church, the tiles, the paintings of the vault and the gilded carving were also installed during the eighteenth century. According to popular tradition, the church had a rich collection of silver and sacred art, which were looted during the French occupation in the early nineteenth century. In 1823 the clock tower was built, whose stonework was used from the ruins of the Church of Santa Maria.In 1932 the municipal museum was installed in the old South Sacristy. It was elevated to a National Monument in 1924.
