= Ponta da Piedade =

Portuguese rock formation

Coordinates: 37.081°N 8.670°W

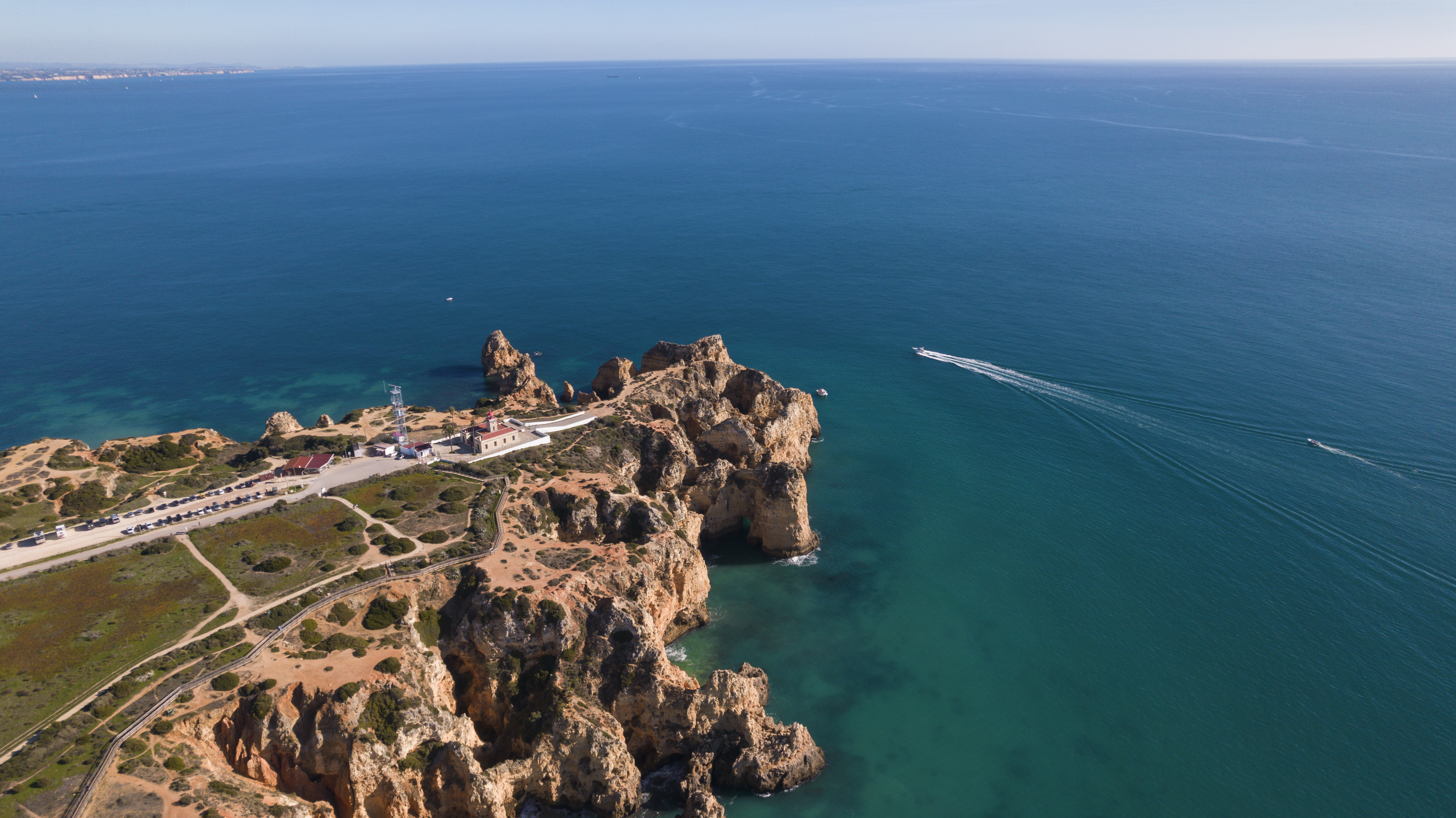
View of Ponta da Piedade

Ponta da Piedade (Portuguese for "point of mercy") is a headland with a group of rock formations along the coastline of the town of Lagos, in the Portuguese region of the Algarve. Consisting of yellow-golden cliff-like rocks up to 20 meters high, they are one of the most famous tourist attractions of Portugal. Several grottos in Ponta da Piedade can be visited by boat. The location also contains a lighthouse, dating back to 1913.

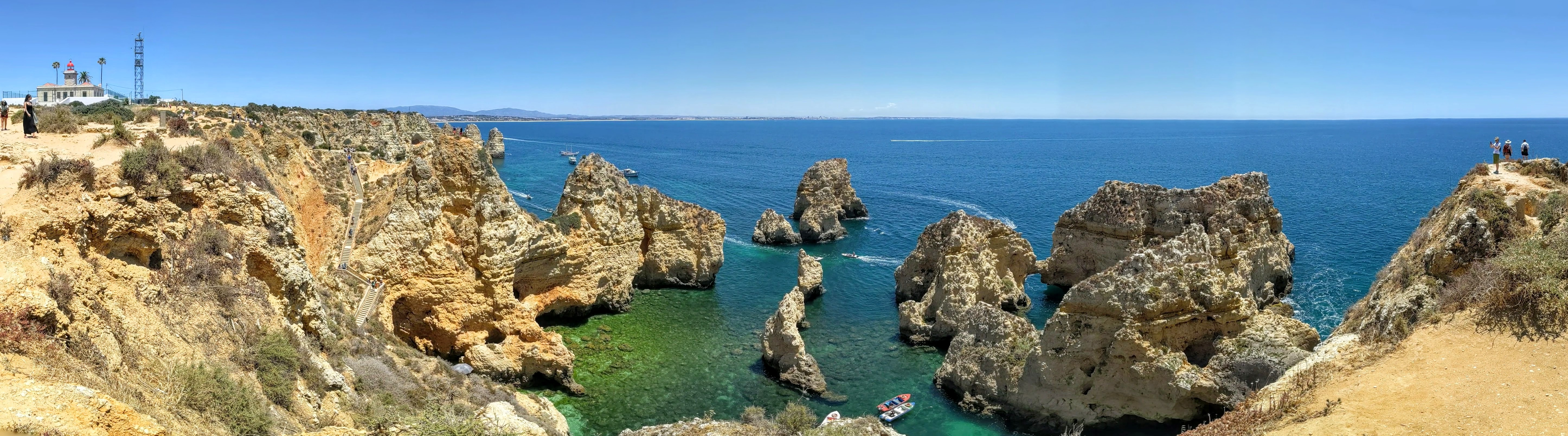
Ponta da Piedade panoramic view, with Ponta da Piedade Lighthouse at the left
