= DestiNet.eu =

DestiNet.eu is a Knowledge Networking portal for Sustainable Tourism and Responsible Tourism. It was started in 2002 by the European Environment Agency (EEA) and the Network Evolution for Sustainable Tourism (NEST).

The World Tourism Organization (WTO) and the United Nations Environment Programme (UNEP) became partners in 2006.

ECOTRANS has been the executive body since 2005. (ECOTRANS - founded in 1993 - is a non-profit organisation based in Saarbrücken, Germany. It is a European network of experts and organisations in tourism, environment and regional development). QualityCoast is one of the organisation in the Ecotrans-network. It is dedicated to sustainable tourism in coastal regions and relates its members to DestiNet.
