= Estoi Palace =

Historic building in the Algarve, Portugal

Coordinates: 37°05′47″N 7°53′44″W

- Palácio de Estói
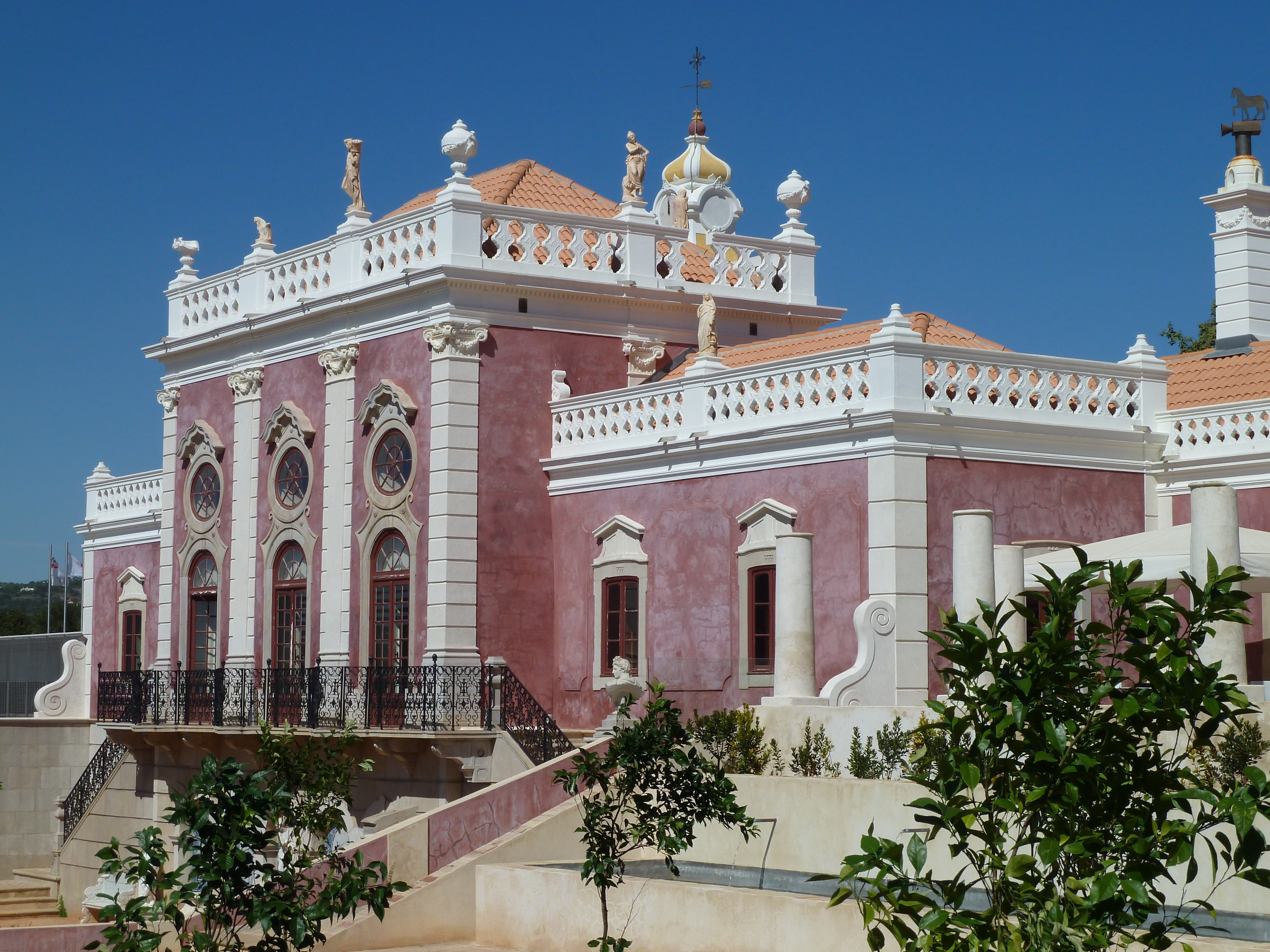
- Main façade of the Palace
- Former names: Jardim de Estoy
- Alternative names: Casa de Estói, Quinta de Estói and Quinta do Carvalhal

General information
- Type: Palace
- Classification: Property of Public Interest
- Location: Estoi, Faro, Algarve, Portugal
- Construction started: 18th century
- Completed: May 1909
- Renovated: 21st century
- Owner: Pestana Group; Faro City Council

Design and construction
- Designations: Hotel

Estoi Palace (Portuguese: Palácio de Estoi), also known as Casa de Estói, Quinta de Estói, and Quinta do Carvalhal, and originally as Jardim de Estoy, is a historic building located near the town of Estói, in the municipality of Faro, in the Algarve region of Portugal. Part of the Estoi Palace complex is occupied by a hotel. It is considered one of the Algarve's main monuments due to its architectural and decorative richness, combining elements of Baroque, Rococo, Neoclassical, and Romantic styles. It has been classified as a Property of Public Interest.

The Estoi Palace complex is large in size and consists of two main components: an old manor house and the gardens. The manor house consists of several sections, roughly forming a U-shaped structure, with the Jardim do Carrascal at the center. It is primarily in the Italian Baroque style, with various elements in other styles. This variety of styles and forms does not always result in a harmonious combination, creating inconsistencies between the elements and resulting in arrangements that could almost be considered kitsch.

Inside, there are several richly ornamented and furnished rooms, decorated in the French style of the 18th century. One of the most prominent areas of the palace is the chapel, which features a bell tower and a Louis XV-style interior, with a tiled ceiling and painted roof. The extensive gardens are organized on three levels and are partially combined with various areas for agricultural production. This area is also richly decorated with exotic trees, sculptures, and tiles, mainly in the Baroque style. Among the most outstanding elements are an 18th-century nativity scene, the sculpture of the Three Graces, made in Pisa, the Ossónoba Fountain set, and two sculptures of shepherds in Carrara marble. On the third floor, the two belvederes, decorated with paintings by Francisco Sousa Alves, are also noteworthy. The tiles in the gardens include polychrome panels on the middle level and blue and white panels by José Maria Pereira Junior on the upper level.

The palace has its origins in an 18th-century Quinta founded by Marshal Francisco de Pereira Coutinho, who was connected to the high nobility and was probably inspired by the National Palace of Queluz. The Quinta was built during a period of great economic and social change in the region, with bourgeois families gaining power in the urban centers, relegating the old noble families to their estates in the interior of the Algarve. Construction of the palace itself did not begin until the mid-19th century, by his son, Fernando de Carvalhal e Vasconcelos, who may have been influenced by the Pena Palace in Sintra. However, he died before the work was completed, and it was taken over by his brother Luís Filipe do Carvalhal, who also died before the palace was finished. The property therefore passed to his younger brother, José Maria Pereira do Carvalhal, and then to his sisters. The property remained abandoned until the 1890s when it was bought by José Francisco da Silva, who restarted the work. The palace was inaugurated in May 1909, in a grand event that lasted three days. José Francisco da Silva died in 1926, and the palace then passed through several owners, leading to its progressive degradation. Despite being classified as a Property of Public Interest in 1977, the first steps towards restoring the palace were only taken at the end of the 1980s when it was acquired by the municipality of Faro. The monument underwent extensive conservation work throughout the 1990s, and during that time, plans began to be made to convert it into a guesthouse, as a way of promoting its profitability. In 2003, work began on adapting it into a guesthouse, which was inaugurated at Easter 2009.

== Description ==
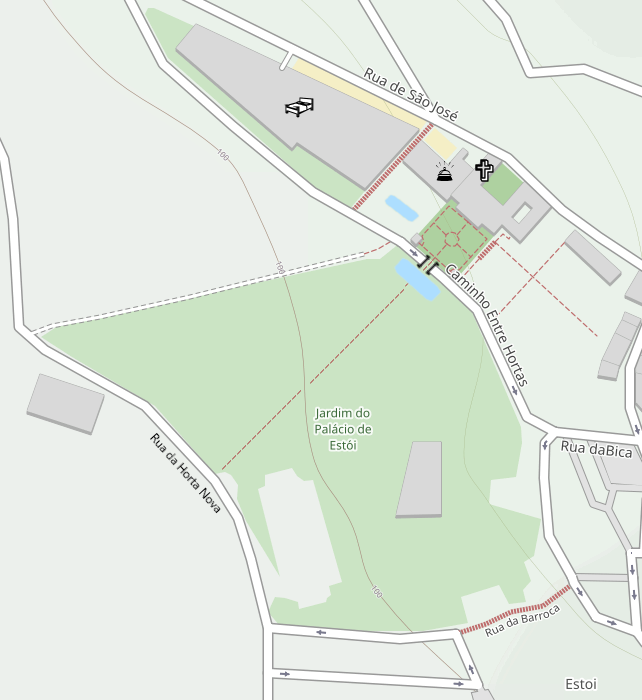
Diagram of Estoi Palace.

=== Location and access ===
The Palace of Estói is located roughly in the northern area of the village of the same name and is part of its urban fabric. It is accessed via the streets of Horta Nova and São José, with the latter being the main entrance to the palace. The archaeological site of the Roman ruins of Milreu is located near the palace. The village of Estói is situated in a rural setting, in the transition between the Barrocal and the coastal strip of the Algarve. It is about 10 km from the county capital, the city of Faro.

=== Conservation and importance ===
The palace and its gardens are known for their eclectic architecture and are considered by many authors to be the most significant example of romantic architecture in the Algarve and one of the most important in the country. The property also stands out for its rich decoration, large dimensions, and the complex integration of the gardens with spaces dedicated to agricultural production. It is regarded as one of the main monuments of Estói, alongside the Roman ruins of Milreu, making the village one of the best-known in the Algarve region.

The palace's importance stems in part from its unique monumentality in the region, where palatial heritage is uncommon due to the poor economic conditions over the past few centuries, social instability, and natural disasters. In an article published in the periodical Povo Algarvio in 1963, journalist Luciano Marcos emphasized how the palace and its gardens were a recreation of the wealthy residences of the past: “In the charming palace of Estoi one could shoot a film without spending astronomical amounts of money, as large companies do when they want to create films depicting the opulent life of bygone times. It was exactly this kind of life that I saw around me when I looked at that terrace with a beautiful lake in the middle, upon which stood a valiant work in marble, a masterpiece of the sinzel, like all the busts and human figures this palace contains.”

The palace and its gardens have been classified as a Property of Public Interest and are part of the protection zone of the Old Urban Center of Estói.

=== Composition ===
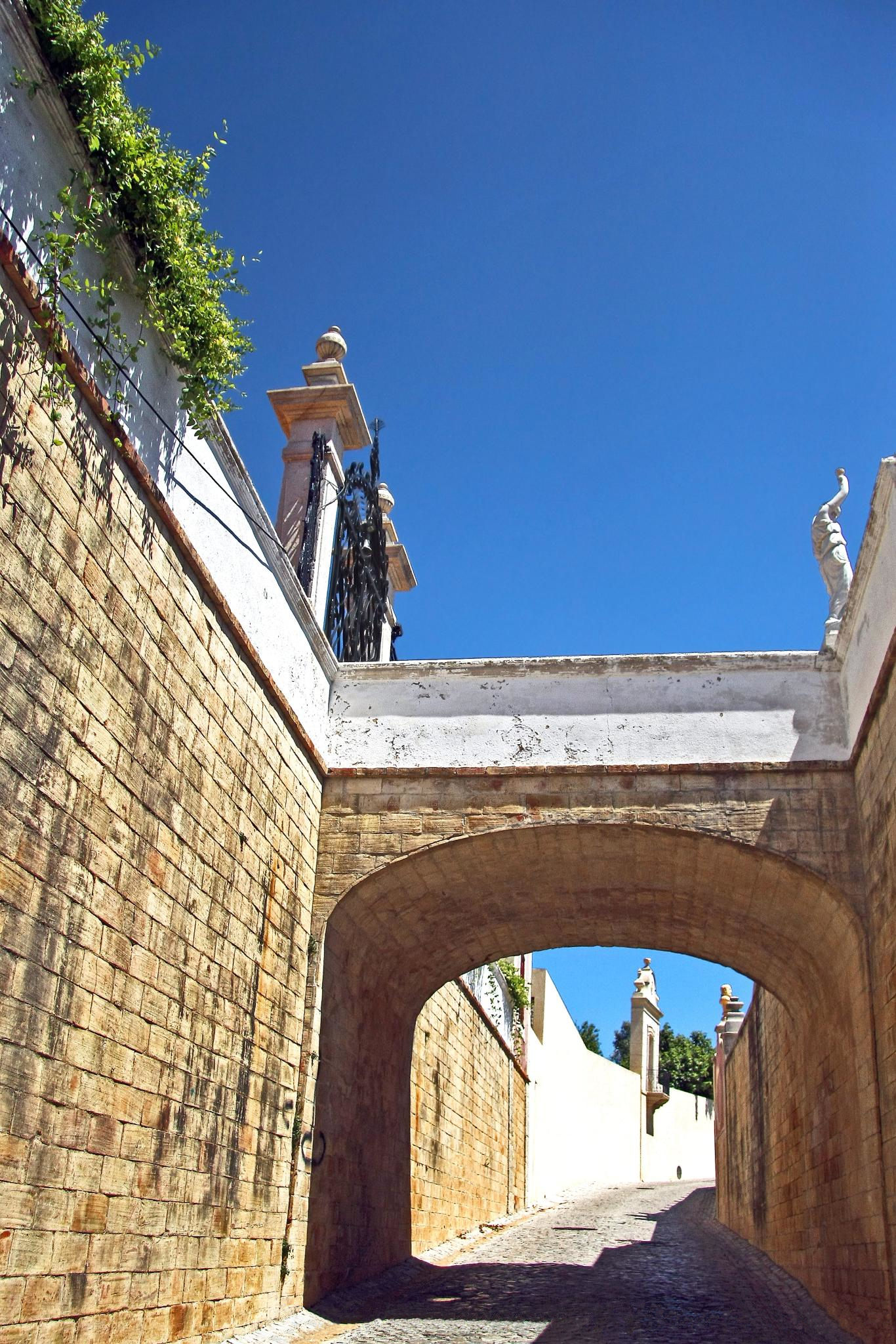
The street that cuts through the middle of the palace estate, with a bridge connecting the two halves.

The Estoi Palace is an example of an old manor house, primarily used during the summer months. It can be classified as a recreational estate due to its composition, which includes the palatial building itself and various open spaces, including extensive gardens. The concept of a recreational estate emerged in the 18th century in the Algarve to describe a property that combined both economic and leisure aspects. In the case of Estoi Palace, the productive areas, such as the citrus groves, were integrated with the garden spaces, which feature various recreational structures and amenities, such as fresco houses, tea pavilions, a bandstand, and several artificial lakes.

The palace is not the only example of a pleasure farm in the municipality of Faro, as other properties can be classified as such, including the Horta dos Macacos and the former Quinta da Família Bívar Cumano. The property is organized in a roughly north–south direction, with the main façade facing north, so that the palace building and the gardens are oriented to the south.

Although the palace complex is a distinct element of Estoi's urban fabric due to its architecture and the structure of its various spaces, it still maintains a connection to the village through the road network, which influenced its organization. This is particularly evident in a road that runs through the property, from the Ossónoba Garden in Estoi, providing access to various agricultural plots, and leading to the division of the gardens into two distinct areas. On the other hand, the palace and its grounds also limited the urban expansion of Estoi, especially to the north.

==== Palace ====
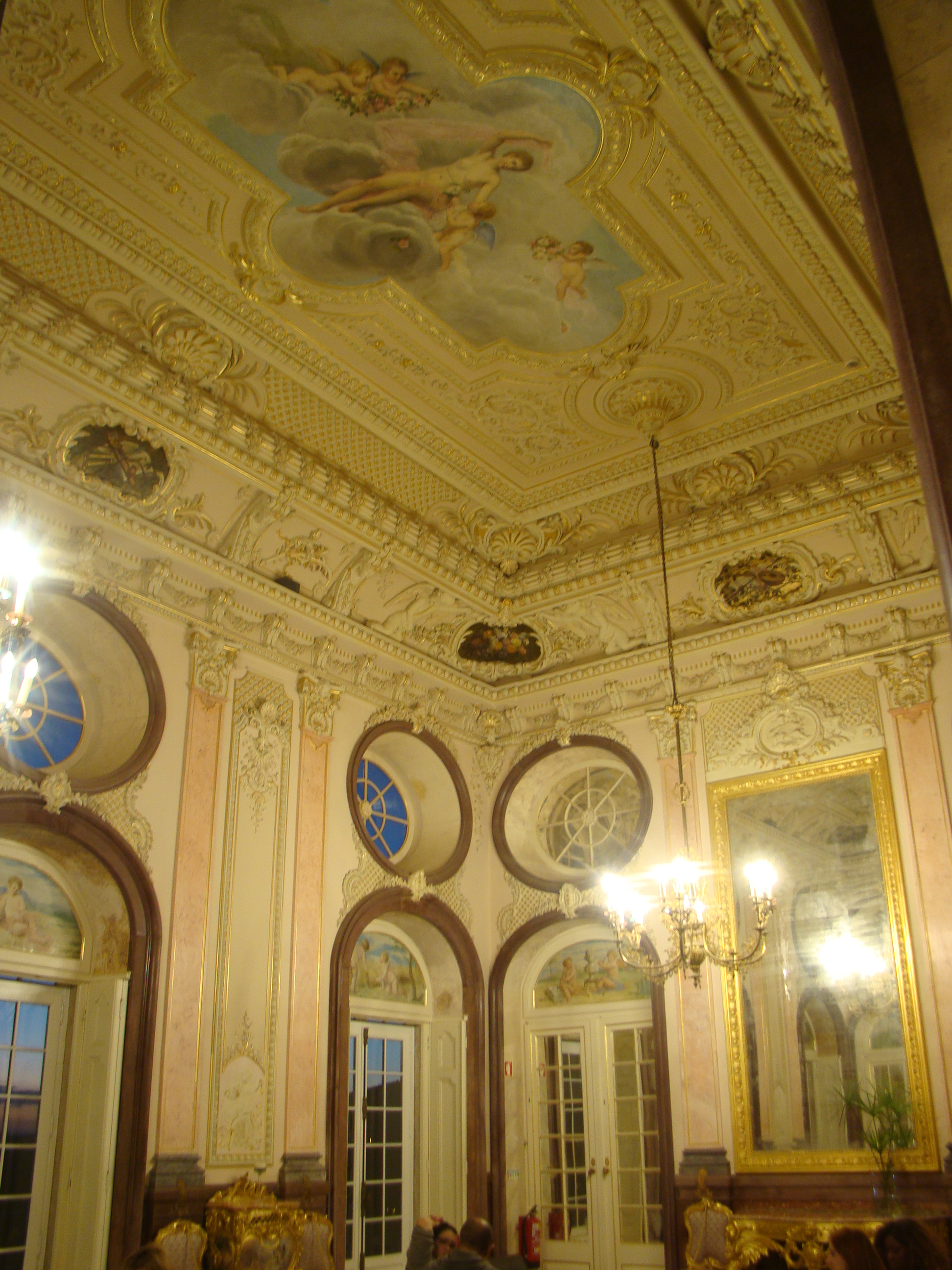
Room inside the palace in 2018.

The palace is a single-story, horizontal building, with the central section higher and protruding from the rest of the façade. The various volumes of the palace are organized in a roughly U-shape, with a square green space in the center, the Jardim do Carrascal, which was originally considered the main entrance to the palace. The exterior façade is relatively sober, organized symmetrically with decorative elements in mortar designed to imitate limestone. The façade facing the gardens is divided into three sections by Ionic pilasters, each of which is divided by a semicircular balcony opening, topped by an oculus with a counter-curved pediment. The building, which forms the upper part of the palace complex, was constructed on an artificial platform to dominate the gardens and the production area, in accordance with 18th-century Enlightenment principles. This influence is also evident in the logical organization of the palace's volumes, with the noble areas in the center, flanked by side wings and the chapel. This arrangement was also influenced by the natural slope of the land on the site of the building.

The building features a mix of styles, with a primary influence from the Italian Baroque, along with elements of Neoclassical, Neo-Rococo, and Art Nouveau. Vilhena de Mesquita described the palace in 1988 as having twenty-eight rooms, which are of particular interest due to their size and the richness of their furnishings and decoration. Notable rooms include the Great Hall, the Dining Room, and the Visitors' Room, the latter also known as the Sala Azul. The interior decoration follows the French style of the 18th century, with the Great Hall, for example, designed in the Louis XV style. This room was decorated with ceiling paintings and windows by Adolfo Greno, along with small canvases by the artist José Maria Pereira Júnior (Pereira Cão). The gilded stucco painting was created by Manuel da Costa. The furniture was supplied by Manuel Marino's company and features lacquerwork by the artist Domingos Costa. Both Adolfo Greno and Domingos Costa also contributed to the interior decoration of the Main Church of Estoi.

The Renaissance-style Dining Room also stands out for its ceiling paintings, executed by José Maria Pereira Júnior, and its walnut furniture, with Italian-style carvings. Next is the Visiting Room, also decorated in the Louis XV style, with a ceiling painted by Domingos Costa and furniture supplied by Manuel Marino's company. Other notable features of the palace include two rooms with ceilings painted by the artist Maria Barreta from Naples, and the vestibule that leads to the Jardim do Carrascal. The palace's rooms are square and rectangular in shape and can be accessed through long, narrow corridors, although most rooms have connecting doors. Another prominent artist who worked on the palace was Pereira Cão, who contributed as a tile maker and decorative painter.

==== Chapel and guesthouse ====
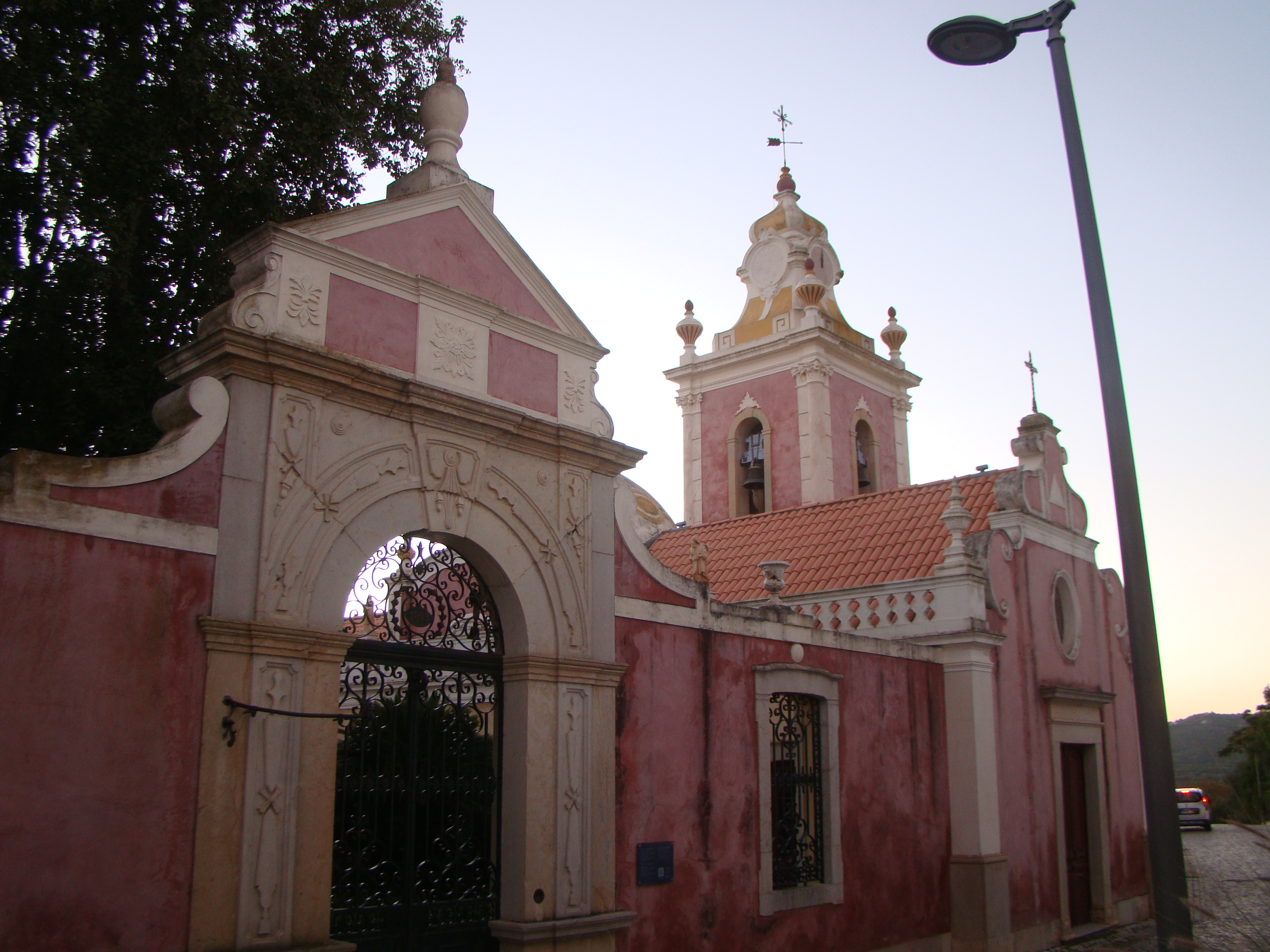
Exterior façade of the Palace, with the chapel and bell tower on the right.

On the western side of the palace building is the chapel, which also borders the Jardim do Carrascal. It has a longitudinal plan, with a single nave, and an imposing bell tower. The main façade is single-paned, with a prominent basement, and is topped by a triangular pediment. The interior of the chapel also follows a Louis XV aesthetic, with walls lined with tiles and a ceiling painted with scenes of the Ascension of Christ by the artist Francisco Luís Alves. The chapel was dedicated to the Holy Family and originally featured a painting with this theme on the high altar, painted in 1755 by Santos Ferreira, from the Real Academia de Bellas Artes de San Fernando in Madrid. However, the painting was stolen around 1988. Also of interest are the two side altars and two 17th-century paintings, one of which is attributed to Bento Coelho da Silveira. Other notable features of the palace include a tower for accessing the roofs, a water tank, and two fresco houses.

Attached to the west side of the palace is the volume of the hotel, designed to follow the topographical layout of the gardens, with three levels of terraces divided by two supporting walls. The upper and middle terraces correspond to the roofs of the rooms. These terraces were covered by garden areas to reduce the visual impact of the new volumes from the palace and its gardens, with designs by landscape architect João Ceregeiro. This section is dedicated solely to the accommodation units, which, according to the original plan, numbered 63. An additional volume was built for the spa and outdoor swimming pool. The palace itself houses the common areas of the hotel, such as the lounges, restaurant, and reception. It also includes an exhibition area with a museological section on the historical evolution of the region. The palace's former kitchens were converted into the restaurant Visconde, and several original elements of the space were preserved, such as the telephone system, stove, chimney, and sinks.

==== Gardens ====
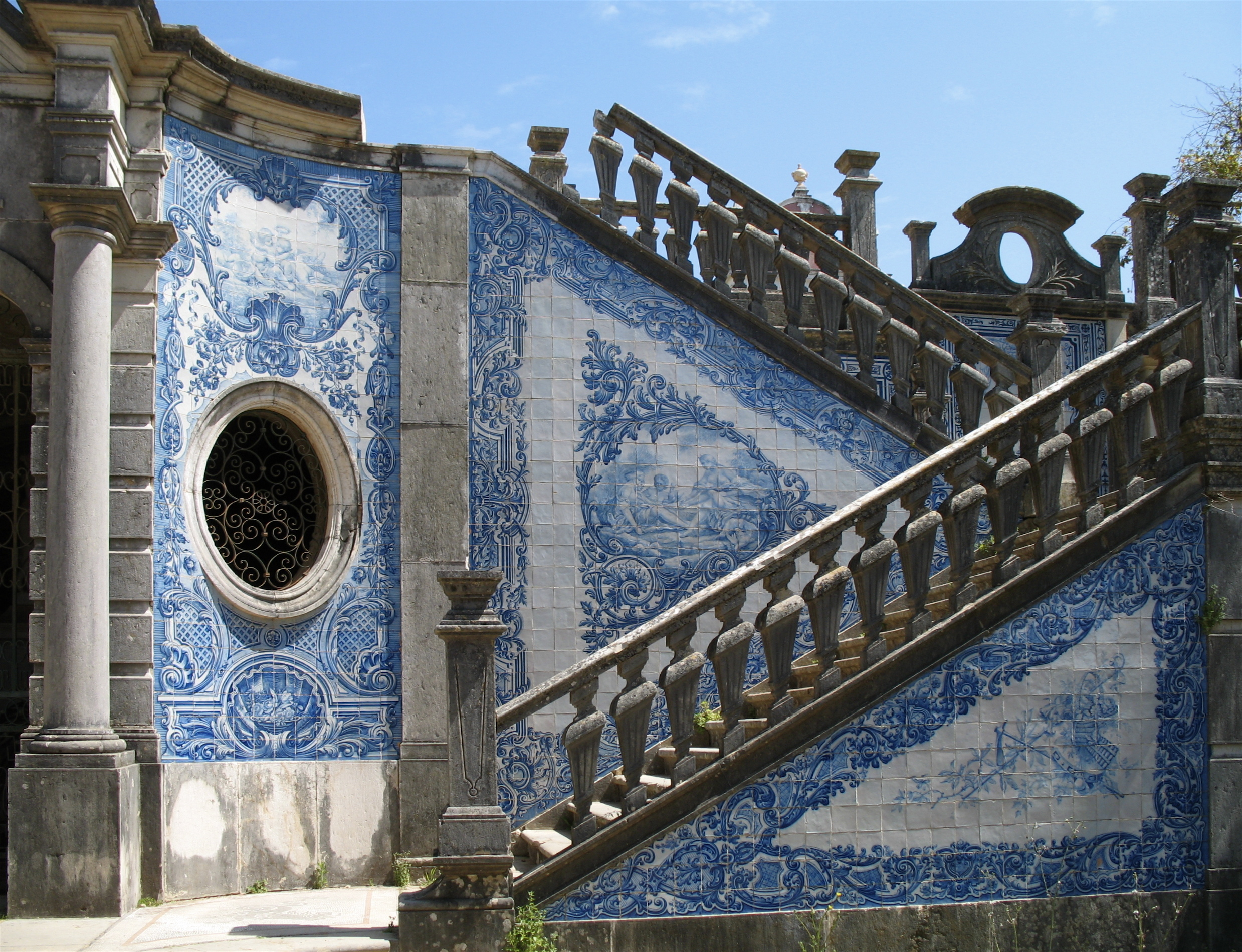
Detail of a staircase with tiled walls.

While the palace building was constructed in a hilly area, the part of the estate corresponding to the gardens and production areas was placed in flatter spaces more suited to agricultural practices. This area is spread over three levels, connected by double staircases with opposing flights. The gardens are decorated with busts, statues, tile panels, and other elements, including a crib from the 18th-century Portuguese school. The dominant style of the gardens is Baroque, while the statues and mural decorations are more aligned with 19th-century standards. This three-level configuration was designed to better utilize water resources, which are channeled through small aqueducts to a waterfall and then used to supply the agricultural areas and stables.

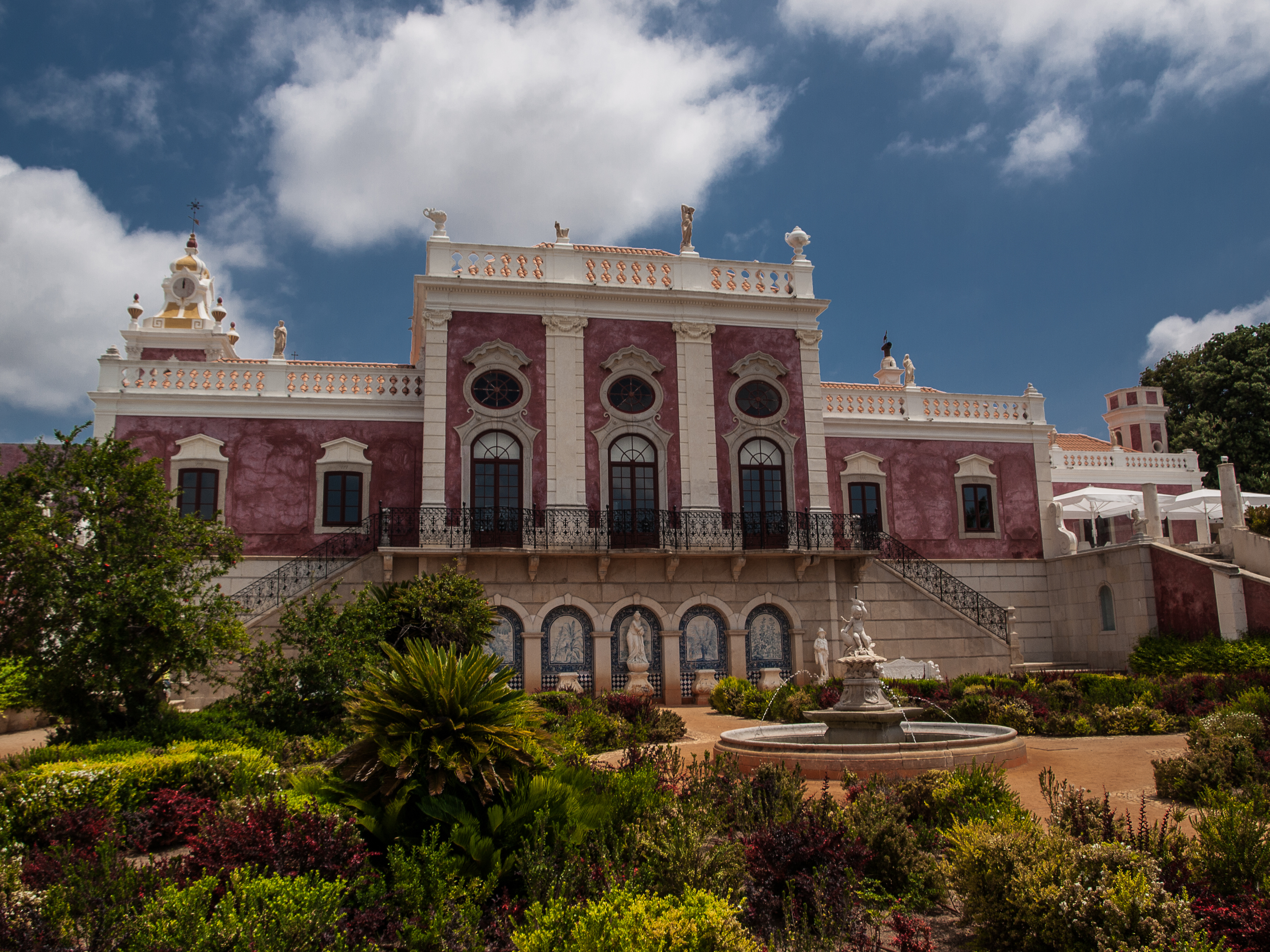
Garden details.

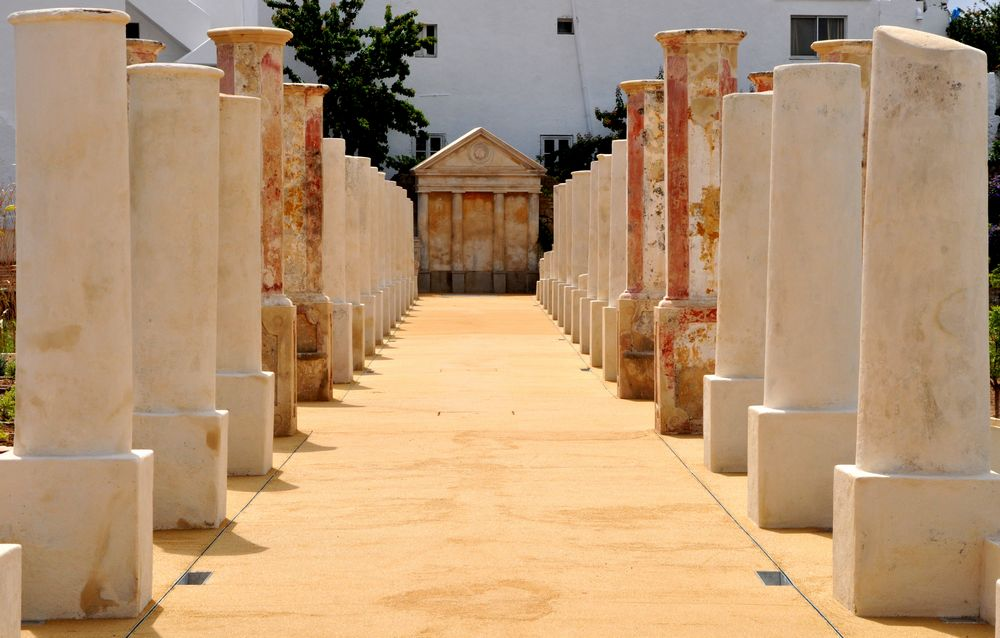
Courtyard with columns.

Vilhena Mesquita describes the access road to the palace as an "interesting avenue, along which we come across some works from the palette of Domingos António da Silva Meira, interspersed with the masonry of the brothers José and Joaquim Aleixo and the stonework of master José Lopes and José Maria Paulino Fernandes, which support the ironwork of locksmith Joaquim José da Fonseca." However, the organization of the decorative elements in the gardens was criticized by Oliva Guerra in the magazine Alma Nova in 1926: “This stately palace, where the well-kept gardens are at odds with the profusion and bad taste in the distribution of the sculptures, lined up in niches, on plinths, and on the cymatia, without order, without connection, without selection criteria, randomly mixing Schiller with Fernão de Magalhães, Danton with São Francisco, Milton with Guilherme II, in a sort of magazine of the centuries where coherence and common sense gave way to the most nonsensical confusion of races, eras, and conditions imaginable."

The palace is accessed from the gardens through a monumental-looking gateway, followed by a central thoroughfare that runs through the various levels of the gardens and agricultural production areas. This corridor is lined with trees of exotic species and decorated with busts of illustrious figures from Portugal's history, such as António Feliciano de Castilho, Manuel Maria Barbosa du Bocage, Almeida Garrett, and the Marquis of Pombal. Also noteworthy are two statues originally placed to support lighting equipment, which were made in the workshop of Ferdinand Fabri et Figlio in Florence.

Next is the first landing, with a door topped by the Carvalhal family crest, which leads to the Sala da Cascata, designed as a cold greenhouse. Inside, there is a sculpture known as the Three Graces, carved at the Androny Gallery in Pisa and based on a sculpture by Antonio Canova, also called The Three Graces. This piece attempts to emulate the Renaissance models, such as The Birth of Venus. The walls are decorated with mosaics created in Genoa by the artist Marches Andrea.

The upper floor is marked by a lake surrounded by a balustrade, with a Carrara marble sculpture at its center, known as the Fonte de Ossónoba, featuring statues of mermaids from which water flows. The wall supporting the third floor, on the other side of the lake, is divided by three doors topped by round arches, giving access to a pavilion where a nativity scene by the artist José Pedro da Cruz Leiria is displayed. Also notable in this area is the decoration of the corners where the staircases begin, with exquisite panels of polychrome tiles, topped by bas-reliefs depicting the phases of dusk and dawn.

The third and final level is located next to the main volume of the palace, which is accessed by stairs, and can be considered the formal garden. It features two belvederes, also known as tea rooms, located in the corners facing the second floor. These belvederes are adorned with various bucolic paintings by Francisco Sousa Alves, especially the ceiling drawings simulating landscapes of Switzerland. Also of special interest are the blue and white tile panels by José Maria Pereira Júnior and the various busts of notable political and artistic figures, such as Luís Vaz de Camões, John Milton, Otto von Bismarck, and Helmuth von Moltke, as well as figures from classical mythology, including Jupiter, Venus, and Diana. On the wall bordering the palace are two Carrara marble sculptures, created by Louis Samain in 1800, depicting Piedmontese shepherds, which stand out for their realism and artistic beauty.

On the east side of this level is a structure reminiscent of the Roman Ruins of Milreu. On the opposite side of the building is another green space, the Jardim do Carrascal, which was the original entrance to the palace and was decorated with several statues that have since been removed. Another gateway to the gardens is located near Largo da Igreja. The complex of gardens and production areas also includes some old support structures, including a stable and an agricultural warehouse.

== History ==
=== Background ===
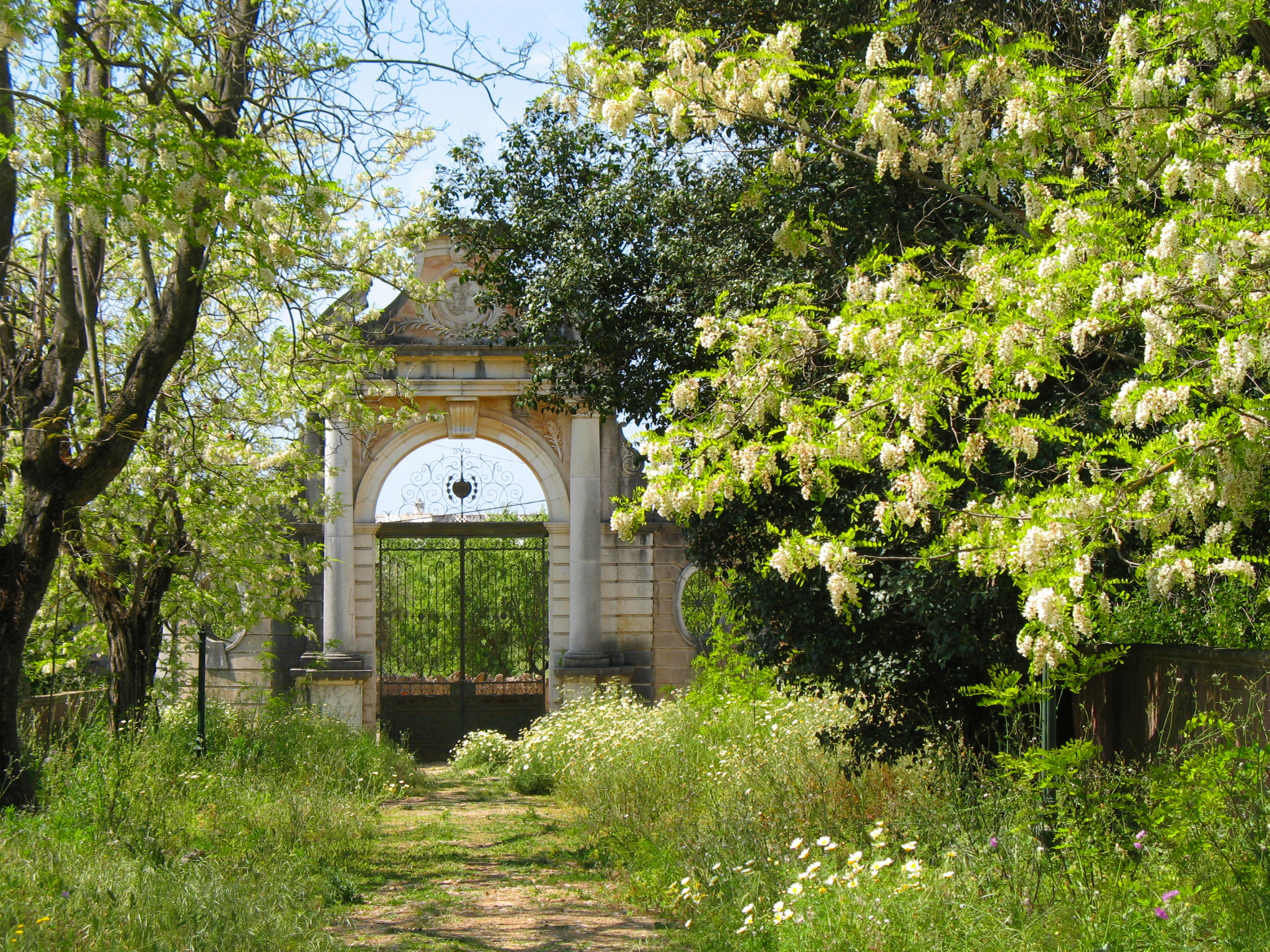
Former entrance to the Palace.

In the 18th century, the site where the palace stands was occupied by a garden area and a small residential building, which belonged to the Bishop of Faro. According to researcher Vilhena Mesquita, the Morgado de Estói was established between 1750 and 1777 by Field Marshal Francisco José Moreira Pereira de Carvalhal Vasconcellos Brito Osório Batávias de Pereira Coutinho, whose income primarily came from the Morgado de Lagos. Francisco de Carvalhal Vasconcellos was a member of the high nobility and had connections to the royal family. He visited the National Palace of Queluz several times, which may have inspired him to build a palatial house on his land in Estoi, which he inherited in 1782.

Researcher Francisco Lameira argued in his article Contributos para o estudo da arquitectura setecentista algarvia: A Quinta de Estoi, published in 2005 in the journal Monumentos, that at the beginning of the 19th century, the names Estoi Palace and Jardim de Estoi did not precisely refer to the same property. Thus, in addition to the garden, there was another property, the Quinta de Estoi, whose construction began between 1782 and 1783 under the direction of Mateus Vicente de Oliveira, who was also responsible for the National Palace of Queluz, which shares some similarities with Estoi Palace. This estate, which became the basis for the future palace, was described as “a farm with magnificent houses, a corresponding garden, various vegetable gardens and sowing land, all designed for grandeur and recreation, with beautiful and famous streets linking the buildings with a walkway of excellent staircases made of stone, supported by entrances and porticos with sturdy pillars.”

Vilhena de Mesquita placed the construction of the Quinta within a context of major social and economic changes in the Algarve following the 1755 earthquake. The old oligarchic elites progressively gentrified, becoming more open to new liberal ideologies, while the old noble families saw their power diminish and retreated to their estates in the interior. At the same time, the region experienced significant economic development, with increases in fishing and agricultural production, boosted by maritime transport to Lisbon and abroad. During the Napoleonic occupation of Portugal, the Quinta hosted a reception for the French general Maurin, organized by Francisco de Carvalhal e Vasconcelos.

=== First works ===
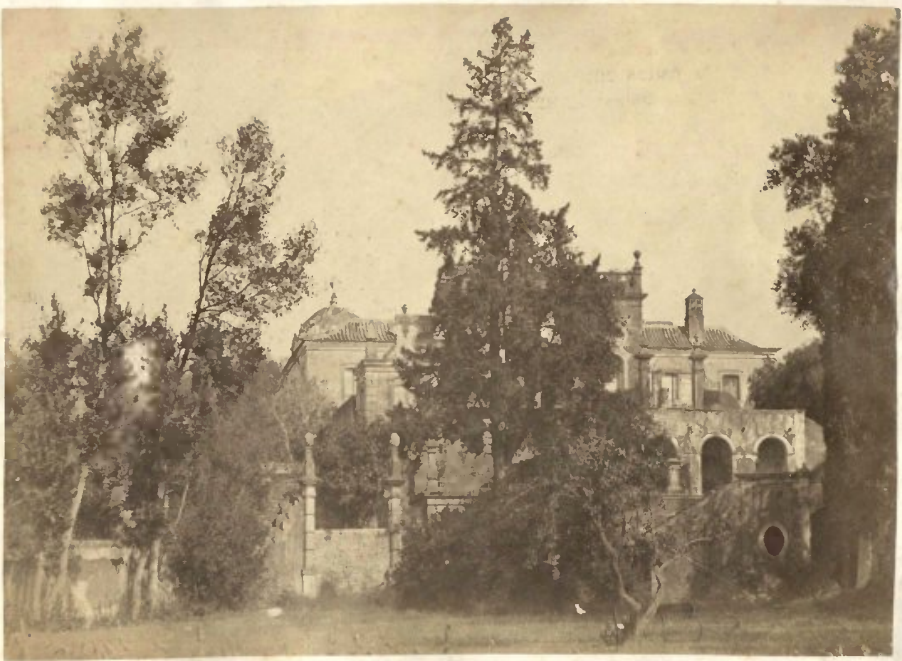
Photograph of Estói Palace, published in the Algarve Illustrado newspaper in 1880.

His first-born son, Fernando José Moreira Osório de Brito Pereira de Carvalhal e Vasconcelos, worked at the Portuguese court, where he met King Ferdinand II. Influenced by the famous Pena Palace in Sintra, he envisioned transforming his parents' property in Estoi into a palace surrounded by gardens. To this end, on February 27, 1817, he acquired the land corresponding to the Jardim de Estoi through an exchange with Captain João José Freire, thereby merging the two properties, Jardim and Quinta de Estoi, into one. In 1823, he passed on his properties and social status to his son, Fernando de Carvalhal e Vasconcellos.

Construction began in the 1840s, but was interrupted by the death of Fernando de Carvalhal e Vasconcellos in 1847, leaving the property abandoned. The land then passed to his brother, retired field marshal Luís Filipe do Carvalhal, who resumed the work, marking the start of the second phase of construction. This phase probably coincided with the installation of most of the buildings and the coat of arms at Casa da Cascata. However, Luís Filipe died in 1861, before the palace had been completed, and the property was inherited by his younger brother, José Maria Pereira do Carvalhal.

As José Maria had no descendants, he decided on October 23, 1866, that the palace would remain for the enjoyment of his sisters. After their deaths, it was to be sold, and the proceeds distributed to the poor and some of his friends. According to Vilhena Mesquita, this will reflect the process of the extinction of the old Algarve nobility, due both to the lack of descendants and to financial reasons, caused by the economic changes that began in the 18th century, which led to the sale of large agricultural properties in the interior. The will itself can be seen as evidence of this situation, as it refers to his ancestors as the original owners of the land: “I leave to my sisters [...] the usufruct of all the assets that were bound by our grandparents and of which I was the last administrator.” Pereira do Carvalhal died on February 16, 1875, and the property passed to his sisters.

In 1880, the matter fell under the jurisdiction of the Lisbon Orphanage Court, and the first executor of the will, Joaquim Teófilo Genez Pereira, was responsible for the property. Even then, the palace and gardens were renowned for their rich and exquisite decoration, with an imposing statuary, a large lake with a waterfall, and several centenary trees. The chapel, with three altars, also stood out, with several oil paintings and sculptures inside. The land was later sold at public auction and acquired by José Martins Caiado, João Pires and D. Maria do Carmo Mascarenhas, who were unable to prevent the gradual deterioration of the property. During the 19th century, attempts were also made to set up a company to install a health center on the palace property, as Estói was much sought after by patients due to its mild climate and the purity of its waters. If it had gone ahead, this initiative would have contributed to the conservation of the palace and gardens, which by the early 1880s were in an advanced state of disrepair after several years of neglect. The presence of a health establishment in Estoi was also envisioned by the eminent doctor José Tomás de Sousa Martins, who at the end of the century was in that town and São Brás de Alportel investigating the possibility of building a sanatorium. The palace gardens began to be frequented by the inhabitants of Estoi from the end of the 19th century, and for many years served as a public park. In 2008 they were still open to the public, albeit in a conditioned way.

=== Completion of the palace ===
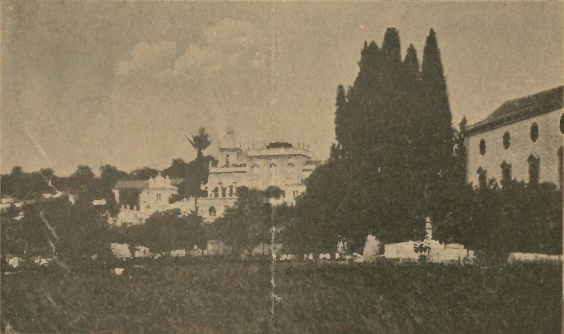
Photograph of the Palace and gardens, published in the magazine Alma Nova in 1915.

In 1893, the owners at the time—José Martins Caiado, João Pires, and Maria do Carmo Mascarenhas—sold the palace complex to José Francisco da Silva, who paid 5,446$23.4 réis for the palace, gardens, and farm. The proceeds from the sale were distributed to the poorest inhabitants of Estói. When it was acquired by José Francisco da Silva, the palace was already in a state of disrepair.

José Francisco da Silva, a native of Estoi, had established himself as a wealthy pharmacist and landowner. He began work on restoring the palace and its gardens in January of that year, with the project directed by the architect and decorator Domingos António da Silva Meira, who had gained recognition for his work in decorating various rooms of the Pena Palace in Sintra. This restoration included the construction of the portal on Barroca Street, the bell tower next to the chapel, and a single-story building on the east side of the palace. In addition to introducing new elements, several parts of the palace that had been destroyed were also restored.

Various Portuguese and foreign artists contributed to these works, including sculptors from the Androny Gallery in Pisa, Genoese mosaic painter Marches Andrea, tile painter Francisco Luís Alves, artist José Pedro da Cruz Leiria (responsible for the Nativity scene), and painters Bento Coelho da Silveira, Adolfo Greno, Maria Baretta, José Maria Pereira Junior, Domingos Costa, and Santos Ferreira. Several works of art were also commissioned from Portugal and other countries, primarily Italy. In addition to various contemporary items, 17th-century paintings, 19th-century naturalist canvases, and 17th-century sacred art pieces were also purchased.

The work was completed at the end of April 1909 and cost more than 9,000 réis, a significant amount for the time. In recognition of his efforts to preserve one of the most important monuments in the Algarve, King Carlos I granted José Francisco da Silva the title of Viscount of Estoi, who was then the Civil Governor of Beja, by decree on January 4 or 9, 1906. The palace and its gardens were inaugurated between May 1 and 3, 1909, in a grand celebration organized with the support of the civil and religious authorities of Faro.

The inauguration ceremony began with the blessing of the chapel and bells by the prior of Estoi, António Francisco de Paula Mendonça, followed by a concert in Ossónoba Square by the Artistas de Minerva philharmonic band from Loulé. In the afternoon, a civic procession took place from the palace gardens to Ossónoba Square, where, upon arrival, the philharmonic band played the School Anthem, accompanied in chorus by the students. This was followed by poetry readings by the students and the distribution of goods to the needy. In the evening, the philharmonic held another concert in the square, which had been illuminated for the occasion.

The celebrations on the second day began at five o'clock in the morning with a salute and a procession by the philharmonic through the streets of the village. Around eleven o'clock, Bishop António Barbosa Leão entered Estoi and followed in procession to the palace. At noon, Mass was held in the chapel, during which the orator Pedro Manuel Nogueira gave a speech. At 5:00 p.m., the procession began again from the parish church, accompanied by the two Loulé philharmonic bands, followed by a Te Deum in the church. At 8:00 p.m., a dinner was organized in the palace's corresponding room, which was illuminated, as were several squares and streets in Estoi. The second day's celebrations concluded with a fireworks display, featuring the famous pyrotechnic artist José de Castro from Viana do Castelo. On the third day, only the opening of the gardens and the palace to the public took place, with great demand, attracting around five thousand visitors.

Due to its architectural and decorative richness and its lush vegetation, the palace quickly became an important attraction at the local, county, and regional levels, drawing many national and international visitors. It was even used as a filming location for several movies, including one directed by Carlos Filipe Porfírio, produced by a company based in Faro. In February 1913, the gardens were visited by a delegation of British journalists as part of an excursion to Portugal organized by the Sociedade de Propaganda de Portugal. That same month, the civil governor, Adelino Furtado, visited the palace and gardens as part of a republican campaign in Estoi, São Brás de Alportel, and Santa Bárbara de Nexe.

On March 4, 1914, the newspaper O Heraldo reported that the president of the ministry, Afonso Costa, had visited the palace along with the civil governor of the district and a group of local republican politicians, as part of his tour of the southern region of the country. On January 20, 1924, the Correio do Sul newspaper reported that the wedding of Maria das Mercês Zeferino and Rodrigo Cabrita Corvo had taken place in the palace's chapel, with one of the witnesses being the Viscount of Estoi himself. In 1925, the documentary Uma Panorâmica do Algarve was shown in Lisbon cinemas, featuring images of various cultural and natural monuments in the region, including the gardens of Estoi Palace.

=== Decline and abandonment ===
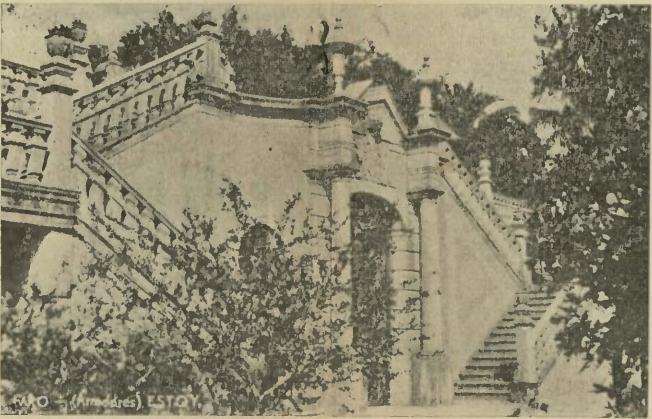
Photograph of a staircase, published in Costa de Oiro magazine in 1939.

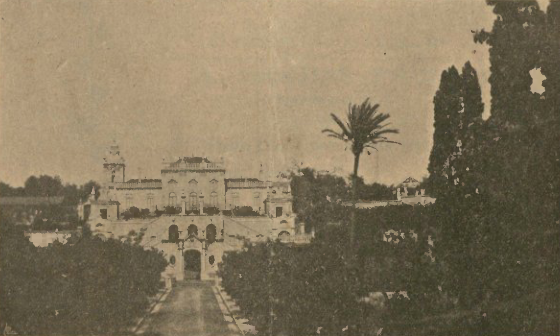
Photograph of the Palace and gardens, published in the magazine Alma Nova in 1915.

José Francisco da Silva died in 1926, unmarried and without children, having specified in his will that the palace should be sold and the proceeds distributed to the poorest inhabitants of Estói. The property was acquired by his cousin and goddaughter, Ana Zeferino, who had only one daughter, Maria do Carmo Melo Assis Machado. She married António Duarte Assis Machado in May 1946 in a ceremony held in the palace chapel. The newspaper Folha do Domingo described the wedding and the subsequent reception in the palace's rooms: “The chapel was artistically decorated with precious damasks, and both the main and side altars were adorned with an abundance of rare flowers and a great profusion of candles. After the ceremony, the procession moved to the dining room, where a well-chosen and very fine reception was served, prepared at the bride’s parents’ house. The table was attended by waiters from ‘Pastelaria Benard’ in Lisbon. Valuable and artistic gifts could be seen on the corbels." António Duarte Assis Machado died on March 30, 1955, leaving his widow, Maria do Carmo Melo Assis Machado. The couple had a daughter, Maria da Luz Melo Assis Machado, to whom the palace passed.

Subsequent owners focused more on the production area, neglecting the maintenance of other parts, especially the gardens, which fell into severe disrepair. The neglect began soon after José Francisco da Silva's death, when the newspaper O Algarve reported on April 1, 1928, that the clock tower was in danger of collapsing, preventing the annual procession of Senhor Jesus dos Passos, which usually passed in front of the palace, from taking place that year. Despite this, on August 4 of that year, the palace was used as the venue for the wedding of Maria Idília de Brito Mendonça and Eurico António Jardim de Carvalho. The property was completely abandoned after Maria da Luz Machado moved out of the region following her marriage to António Bicker Correia Costa.

Despite its location, the palace was already well known, and by the mid-1930s, the village of Estói had become part of the region's tourist circuit. Both the palace and its gardens continued to be used for events, such as a visit in March 1947, as part of a Portuguese-Argentine gathering, attended by several members of Argentina's legation in Portugal, including the Argentine Republic's chargé d'affaires, Cipriano Pons Lezica. On August 3 of that year, the newspaper O Algarve reported that a ceremony had been organized to commemorate the passage of sailors in the second ocean regatta.

In August 1953, a lunch was offered to children in the palace gardens, as part of the traditional festivals of Our Lady of the Foot of the Cross and the Sacred Heart of Jesus, and the visit of the coadjutor bishop, Francisco Rendeiro. The palace itself was also part of the festive program, as reported by Folha do Domingo on September 13, 1953: “Bishop Francisco Rendeiro made his solemn entrance into the vast temple, which was artistically decorated and filled to capacity, despite it being a working day, to the sound of ‘Ecce Sacerdos Magnus.’ After a brief prayer, and already vested in the robes for the celebration of the Holy Sacrifice of the Mass, [...] seated on the chair, with miter and crosier, he addressed the vast crowd, especially the children at the Solemn Communion, through the microphone. [...] More than 300 people approached the Holy Table, with the Mass being dialogued by the children and the solemn offertory also made by them, in a ceremony of rare brilliance. Some children, accompanied by many other girls, carried the various objects for the Holy Mass in rich silver salvers to His Excellency. [...] When the Mass was over, everyone went to a garden room, where they were offered a well-served breakfast, which Bishop Francisco blessed. Many photographs were taken outside the church and in various corners of the garden. [...] At 4 p.m., the vast halls of the palace were completely filled with people who, accompanied by the Rev. Parish Priest, went to pay their respects. [...] It was already 5 p.m. when the hundreds of people who had filled the Renaissance-style halls of the enchanting Estoi Palace finished kissing the Bishop's ring."

On October 21, 1950, Diário Popular reported on the state of abandonment of the property, as part of a report on the Algarve region: “the beautiful palace of Estoi, among gardens and orchards that are half-abandoned, stretching out on overlapping terraces, with noble staircases, elegant balustrades, and graceful belvederes.” On December 16, 1962, Jornal do Algarve proposed transforming the palace into an art museum. In 1963, Povo Algarvio reported that “we were told that perhaps one day the whole palace would become a guesthouse,” but that “the current owner would never consent to this,” an attitude the newspaper explained as one of “love and pride in owning the most beautiful monument in the Algarve.” On September 17, 1970, Correio do Sul once again called for the palace to be used for tourism, considering it “in its artistic expression and romantic features, a unique piece in the chessboard of Algarve beauties.” A similar appeal was made by journalist Vasco Callixto in O Século. The palace's situation was also criticized by Marcelino Viegas in an article published in Jornal do Algarve on February 3, 1973, in which he described the way the garden was being “despised” as a “crime.” On September 1 of that year, the newspaper published another article promoting Estoi as a tourist destination, especially the palace, which presented ideal conditions for combining accommodation for visitors with its historic value. The property was put up for sale after the Revolution of April 25, 1974.

=== Classification ===
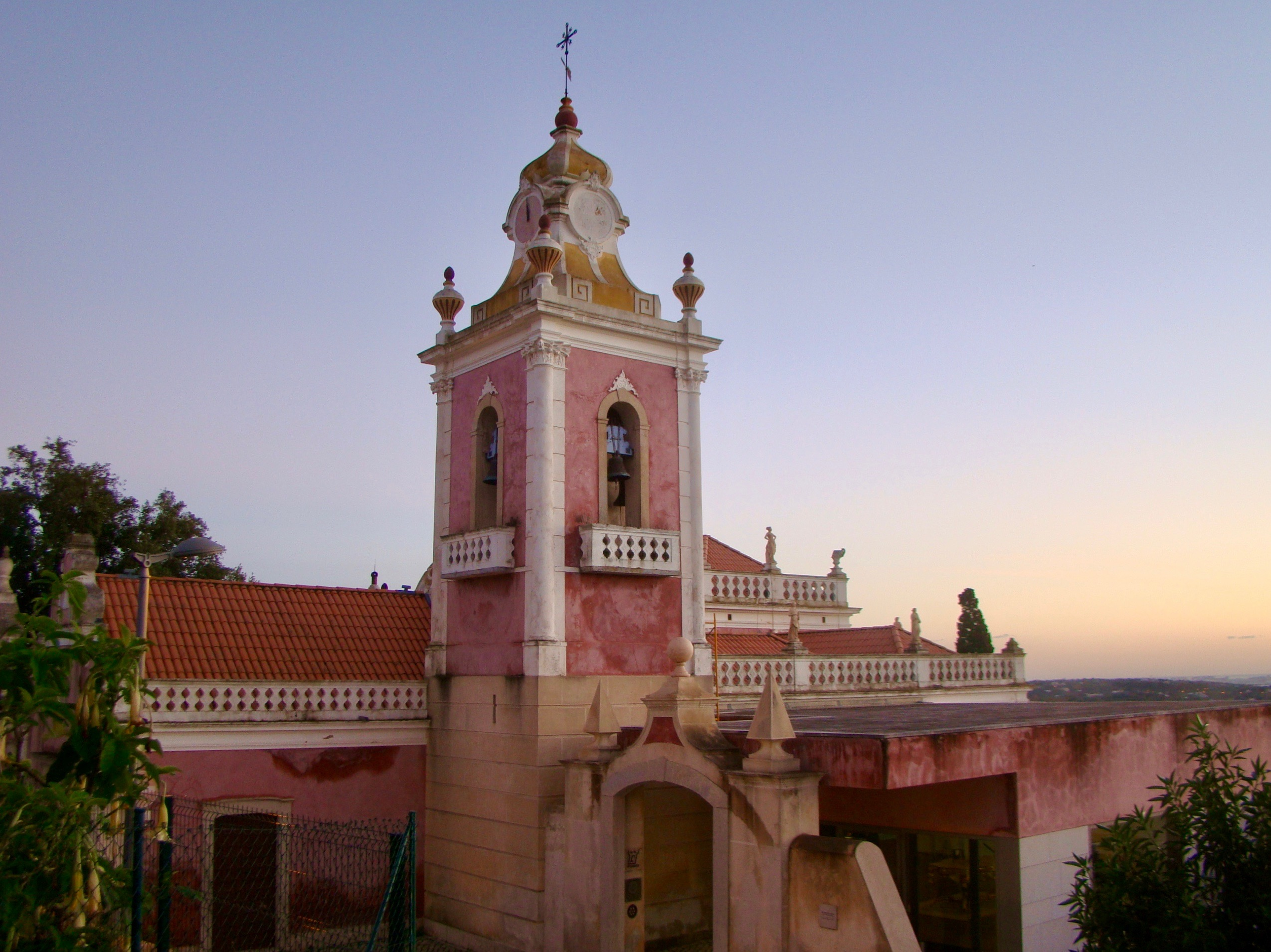
The chapel bell tower, in 2018.

On August 4, 1977, Correio do Sul reported that the Cultural Group of the Algarve Regional Tourism Commission had issued a proposal to classify the palace and its gardens as a National Monument, or at least as a Property of Public Interest. As part of this proposal, it was suggested that the complex could be acquired by the government or local authorities and used as a residence of honor for high-level visitors to the region. The palace and its gardens were classified as a Property of Public Interest by Decree 129/77, dated September 29. At the time, the property still belonged to Maria da Luz Machado.

Despite its classification, in the early 1980s, the palace and gardens were still in poor condition, a situation that researcher José Fernandes Mascarenhas highlighted in an article published in Correio do Sul on January 29, 1981. On September 23 of that year, O Algarve reported that the Secretary of State for Culture was allegedly interested in acquiring the palace, along with its gardens and surrounding properties, in an investment of around 80 million escudos, and that it would protect this important monument from the interest of large real estate companies.

However, by the end of the decade, the property was still in a serious state of abandonment, and researcher Vilhena de Mesquita urged the Instituto Português do Património Arquitetónico to proceed with its acquisition, as there were already foreign entities interested in buying it, which would prevent it from being reused for cultural purposes. During this period, some suggestions had already been made for repurposing the palace, including using it as a Museum of the History of the Algarve, with a specialized library. Vilhena de Mesquita suggested that, instead of a hotel, the palace could be reused as an inn for artists and intellectuals with more limited financial resources, thus becoming a center for cultural dialogue. Part of the complex and the agricultural land could also be transformed into laboratories for the University of Algarve, where the cultivation of tropical species could be researched, helping to develop the Algarve's agriculture.

=== Adapting to the hotel ===
==== First phase ====
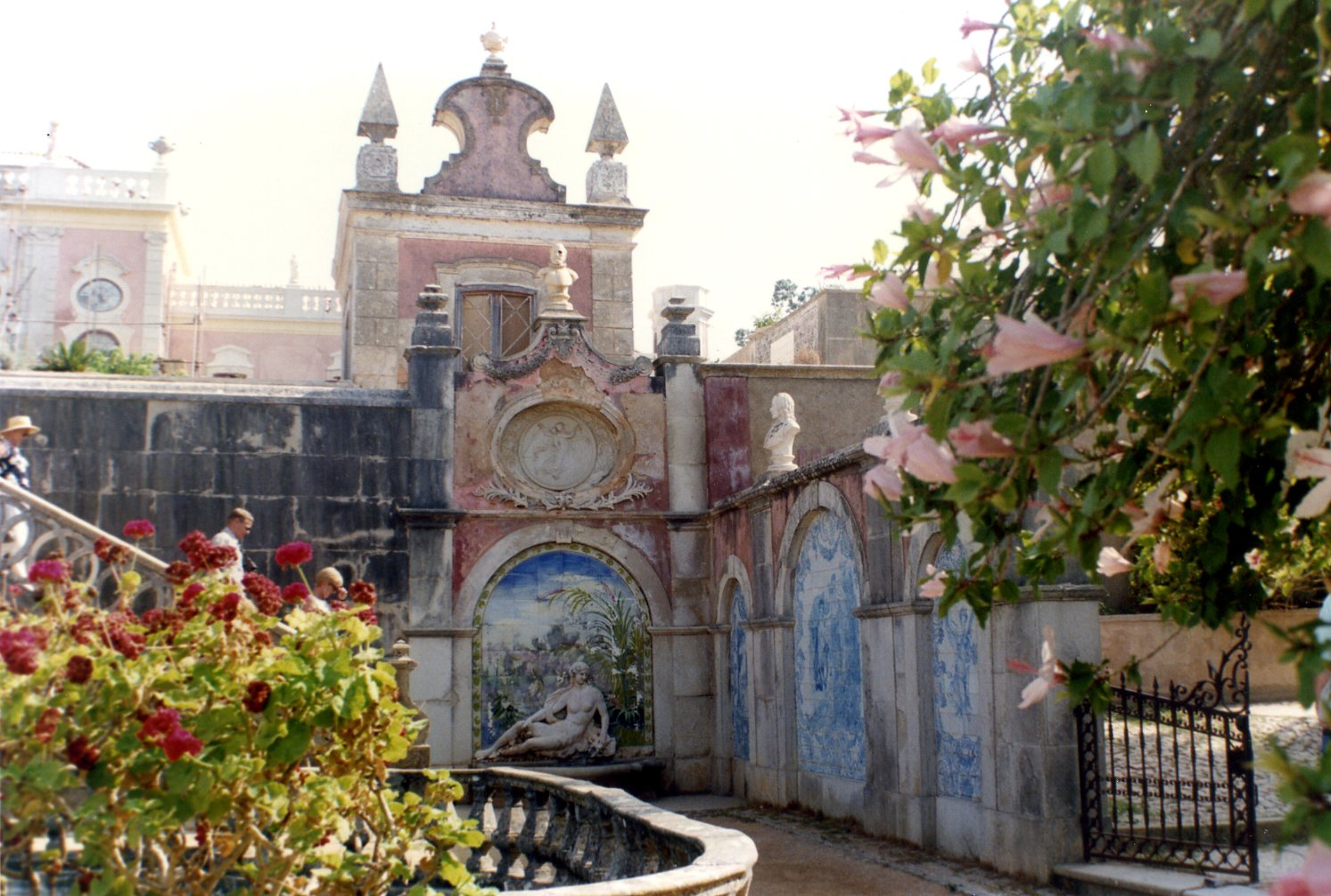
Partial view of the gardens in 1993.

In 1987 or 1988, the Estói Palace complex was purchased by Faro City Council for 140 million escudos. After the acquisition, the gardens were opened to the public. Between 1992 and 1993, conservation work was carried out, which included restoring the nativity scene, the mural paintings, the chapel dome, and the frescoes in the garden. This work continued in 1994, and in 1995, the palace was converted into an official residence, with electricity and telephone networks installed.

As the local authority did not have the necessary funds to maintain and make the property profitable, it proposed repurposing the palace as a hotel. Thus, in the mid-1990s, plans were already in place to convert the palace into a guesthouse for the Empresa Nacional de Turismo (ENATUR). The agreement to transfer it to that company was signed on June 23, 1999, and authorized by the Secretary of State for Public Works on August 4 of that year. In the same year, the palace complex underwent new interventions, which included restoration work, the installation of fire-fighting equipment, and the connection to the electricity grid. The restoration work is of particular interest because it involved various types of artwork, such as gilded wood carvings, stucco, paintings, and furniture, in addition to the necessary civil construction works.

==== Second phase ====
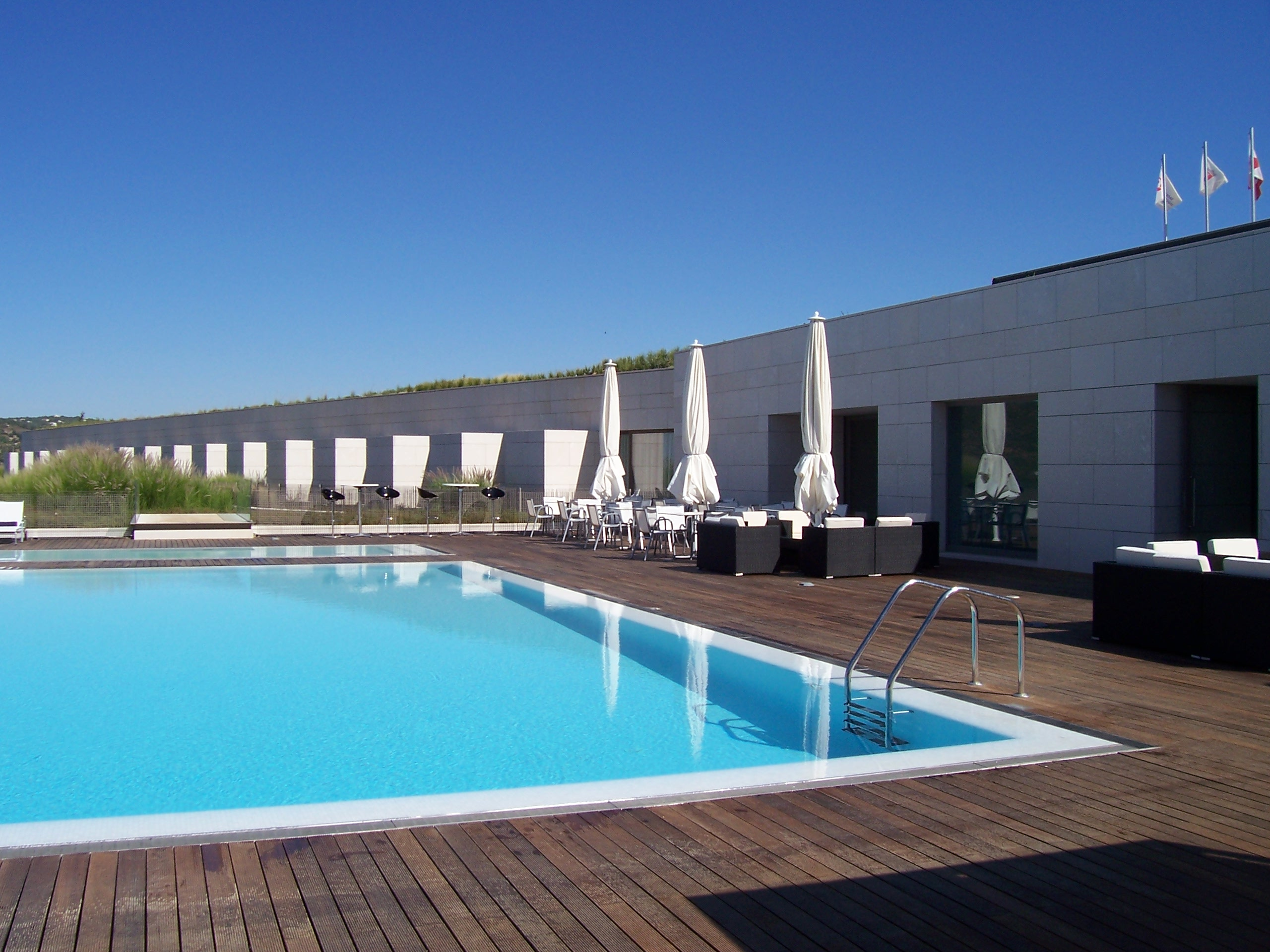
Swimming pool at the pousada attached to the Estoi Palace.

The process of converting the palace into a hotel began in 2003 as part of an ambitious ENATUR program to acquire and transform historic properties into hotels. This initiative also included the Palácio do Freixo in Porto and the Pousada de São Mateus in Viseu. The plan to convert the palace into an inn was developed by architect Gonçalo Byrne, who had also been responsible for the Viseu unit, while the restoration of the existing gardens and the planning of the garden areas adjacent to the rooms were managed by landscape architect João Ceregeiro.

Despite the large size of the palace, it proved to be too small to accommodate the 64 rooms intended for the inn. Consequently, the garden platform on the west side of the palace was extended, with new structures built to house the accommodation units, a spa, and an outdoor swimming pool, while the original building was repurposed for leisure and service spaces. The new volume was designed to align with the topography of the palace and gardens, preserving the complex's organization, with the palace itself remaining the central focus. As part of the restoration program, the former stable and agricultural warehouse buildings in the gardens were also renovated.

In 2008, the Faro municipality was planning to establish a cultural park between the ruins of Milreu and the Estoi Palace. This park was intended to promote and preserve the historical and natural heritage of the area, allowing the space between the two monuments to be used for educational and leisure purposes. Between November 10 of that year and January 20, 2009, work was carried out to dig trenches around the palace for the installation of electrical infrastructure. This work was archaeologically monitored by the ERA company, although no ancient materials were discovered.

The rehabilitation work on the palace coincided with a restoration program for the village of Estoi, as part of an effort to have the village's historic center classified as a Site of Municipal Interest. The pousada opened to the public in April 2009, during the Easter period, and the palace and gardens were also reopened to the general public.

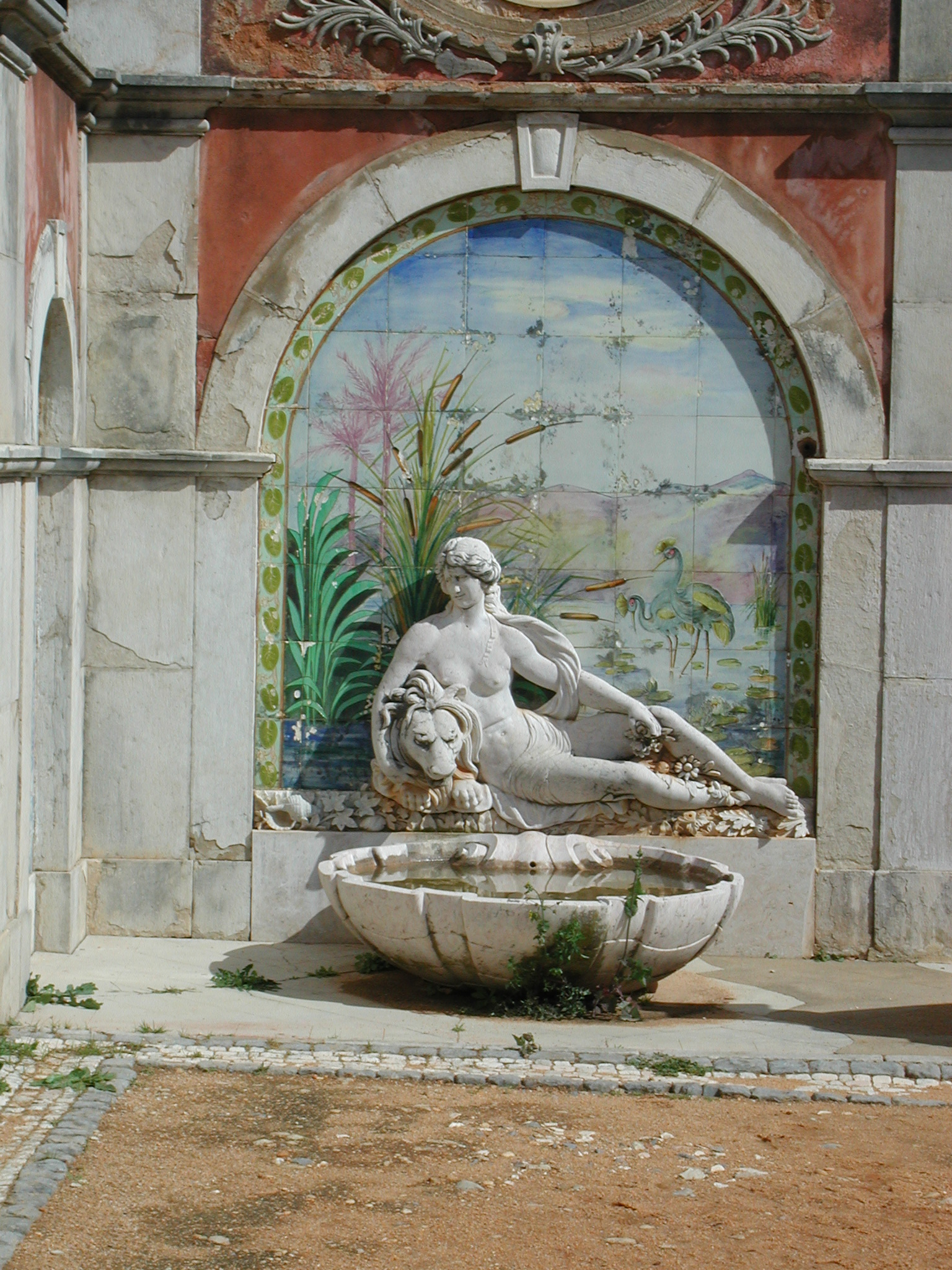
Detail of a sculpture and tile panel in the palace gardens.

In February 2015, the Pestana Group announced that the Estói Palace would be one of three Portuguese pousadas to be integrated into the Small Luxury Hotels of the World, an international chain of luxury hotels. In May 2016, the crib set was placed in the Faro Municipal Museum, where it had undergone restoration, with plans for it to return to the Estoi Palace after the completion of the rehabilitation works.

During the Faro Municipality Day celebrations on September 7, 2017, the south garden of the Estoi Palace was officially handed over to the municipality after undergoing restoration work by ENATUR. In July 2020, the Pousada Palácio de Estói reopened following extensive restoration work aimed at enhancing the monumental appearance of the building. In this context, the French-style halls were restored, and old decorative elements, which had been preserved in the Faro Museum, were reintroduced. Glass display cases were also placed in the halls, showcasing various pieces discovered in the palace, including a classic nativity scene. These works included relocating the reception to the former chapel, while the old space was repurposed as an exhibition area with a museum center in collaboration with the Faro Museum.

== See also ==
- Caldas de Monchique
- Roman ruins of Milreu

== Bibliography ==
- Fernandes, José Manuel; Janeiro, Ana (2005). Arquitetura no Algarve: Dos primórdios à actualidade, uma leitura de síntese [Architecture in the Algarve: From its beginnings to the present day, an overview] (PDF) (in Portuguese). Algarve: Edições Afrontamento/Rainho & Neves Lda. ISBN 972-643-138-7. Archived from the original (PDF) on 2017-08-06.
- Fernandes, José Manuel; Janeiro, Ana (2008). A Casa Popular do Algarve, espaço rural e urbano, evolução e actualidade [The People's House of the Algarve, rural and urban space, evolution and current events] (PDF) (in Portuguese). Algarve: Rainho & Neves Lda. ISBN 978-989-8208-00-2. Archived from the original on 2020-10-10.
- Leal, Miguel Montez (2006). A pintura a fresco entre dois séculos: Pereira Cão (1841-1921) e a pintura decorativa em Portugal [Fresco painting between two centuries: Pereira Cão (1841-1921) and decorative painting in Portugal] (Thesis) (in Portuguese). Lisboa: Universidade Nova de Lisboa.
- Marques, Gentil (1999). Lendas de Portugal: Lendas dos nomes das terras [Legends of Portugal: Land name legends] (in Portuguese) (3rd ed.). Lisboa: Âncora. ISBN 972-780-026-2.
- Mesquita, José Carlos Vilhena (1988). "O Palácio de Estoi: Uma visão do passado numa perspectiva de futuro" [The Palace of Estoi: A vision of the past with a view to the future]. 5° Congresso do Algarve: 331–336. hdl:10400.1/5014.
- Pinto, Julio Lourenço (1894). O Algarve (Notas Impressionistas) [The Algarve (Impressionist Notes)] (in Portuguese). Porto: Livraria Portuense.
- Pinto, Jim Constâncio (2020). Análise Histórica e Plano Diretor de Restauro da Quinta do Palácio de Estoi, Faro [Historical Analysis and Master Restoration Plan for Quinta do Palácio de Estoi, Faro] (in Portuguese). Faro: Universidade do Algarve. hdl:10400.1/16717.
- Santos, Rui Miguel Terremoto dos (2008). Estói: paisagem e património no meio rural [Estói: landscape and heritage in the countryside] (Thesis) (in Portuguese). Évora: Universidade de Évora. hdl:10174/16755.
