= Conceição e Estoi =

- Civil parish
- Location in Portugal
- Coordinates: 37°3′36″N 7°55′12″W
- Country: Portugal
- Region: Algarve
- Intermunic. comm.: Algarve
- District: Faro
- Municipality: Faro

Area
  - Total: 68.40 km^{2} (26.41 sq mi)

Population (2011)
  - Total: 8,176
  - Density: 119.5/km^{2} (309.6/sq mi)
- Time zone: UTC+00:00 (WET)
  - Summer (DST): UTC+01:00 (WEST)
- Website: Junta Freguesia

Conceição e Estoi is a civil parish in the municipality of Faro, part of the Portuguese Algarve, formed in 2013 from the merger of the former parishes Conceição and Estoi. The population in 2011 was 8,176, in an area of 68.40 km^{2}.

== Architecture ==
- Church of Nossa Senhora da Conceição (Portuguese: Igreja Paroquial da Conceição de Faro/Igreja de Nossa Senhora da Conceição); a Manueline era religious building classified as a Monumento de Interesso Público (Monument of Public Interest). Associated with the late-Renaissance and 19th century, the longitudinal plan includes single nave and main chapel with triumphal arch and vaulted ceiling on corbels. In addition, the church is known for its late-Renaissance portal, main facade and neoclassical bell tower, as well as its architectural sobriety contrasting with the decoration of the triumphal arch and cover of the chancel in starry vault.
