= Estoi =

Civil parish in Portugal

Estoi (Portuguese pronunciation: [ɨˈʃtoi]) is a civil parish in the municipality of Faro, in the Algarve, Portugal. In 2013, the parish was merged into a new parish Conceição e Estoi. In 2025 the parish was restored with the implementation of the 25-A/2025 law.

The parish, which includes an area of approximately 46.55 square kilometres (17.97 mi^{2}), had a population of 3,538 at the 2001 census.

The name of the parish, which was formerly spelled "Estói", was changed in 2004.

== Geography ==
Estoi is a village and parish in the municipality of Faro, a rural zone that extends from the fertile fields of Campina de Faro, until the peaks of Serra do Monte Figo (Cerros de São Miguel, Azinheiro, Malhão, Bemposta, Monteiro and Guelhim), that have been, since antiquity, beacons for navigation and natural outlooks along the coast of the Algarvian Riviera.

== Architecture ==
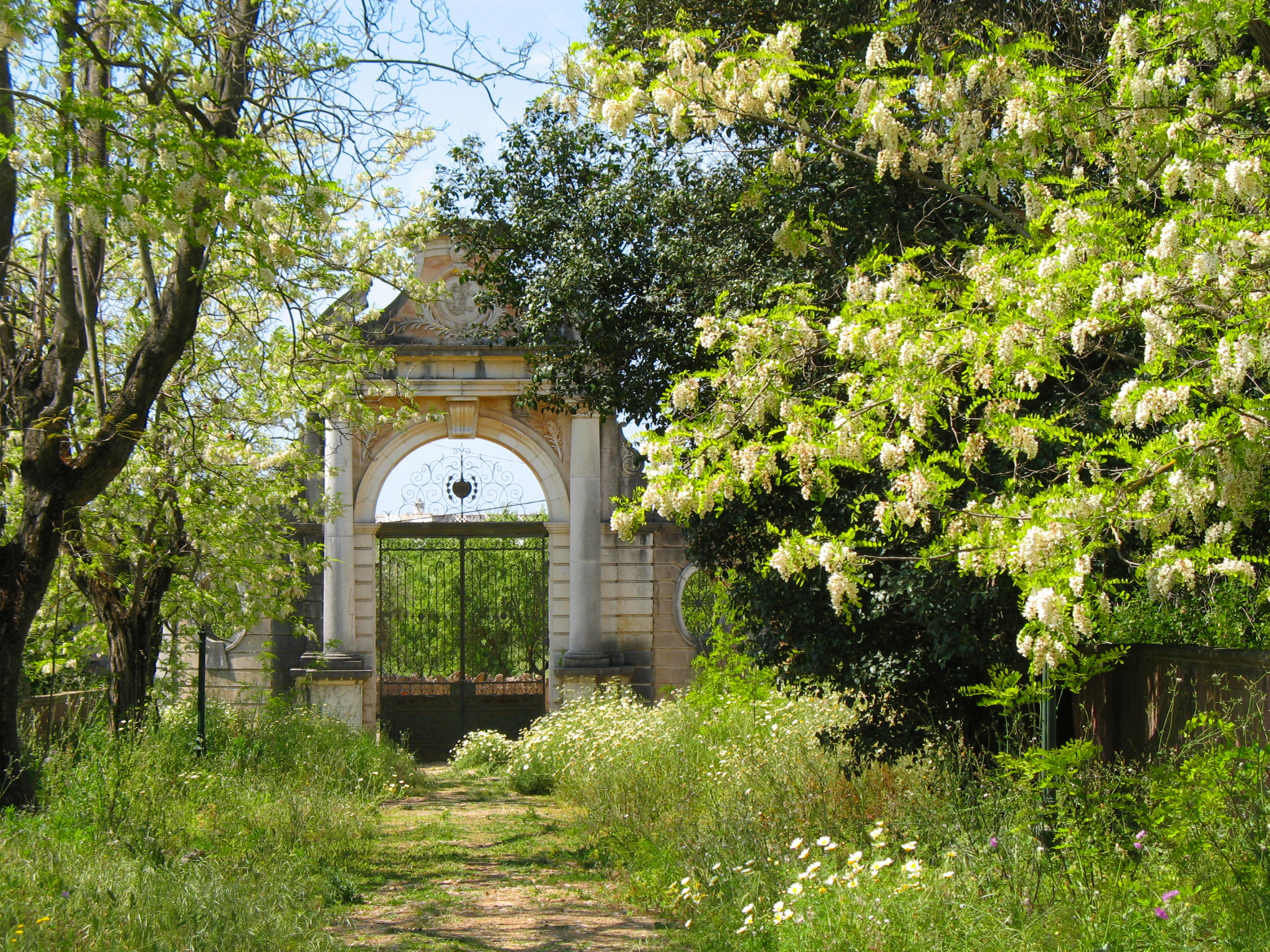
Robinia pseudoacacia flowering in the gardens of Estoi

The Estoi Palace is a rococo building renowned for its gardens and azulejos (blue and white tiled ceramic). The palace was built in the late 19th century and is the finest example of this kind of architecture in the district of Faro.

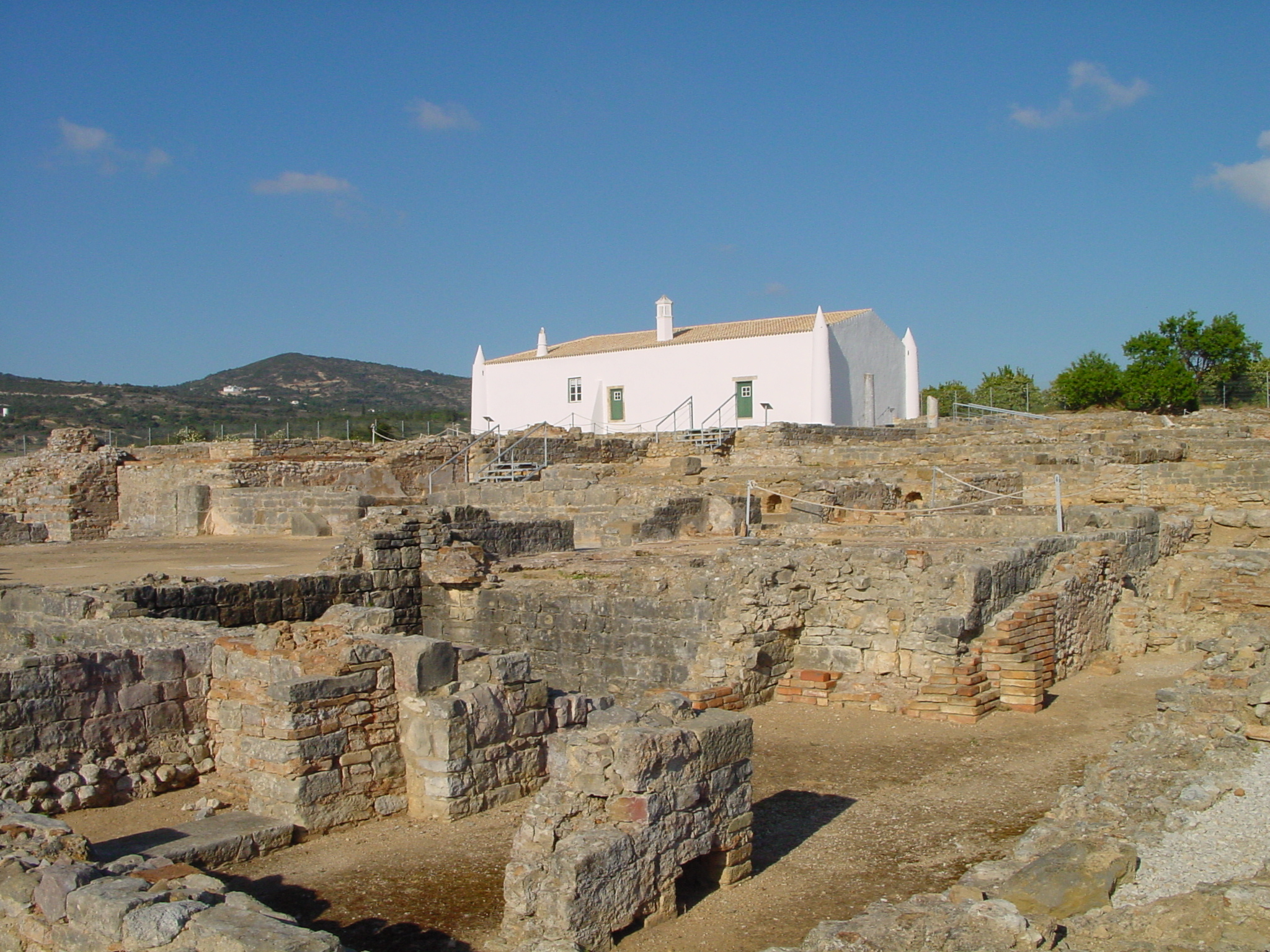
A view of the ruins of Milreu

In the centre of the town is the neoclassical Igreja Matriz de Estoi. An original church at the site dates to the 15th century, but it was significantly damaged following the 1755 earthquake. It would later be restored, and then in the 19th century it would be further updated in neoclassical style. The architect was an Italian named Francisco Xavier Fabri. Other examples of his work are located in nearby towns, most notably the Arco de Vila in Faro.

Just west of this small town, in the vicinity of Estoi, is a ruined Roman villa of Milreu which provides a rare opportunity to see how Romans lived in the 1st-century-AD to the 4th-century-AD. The ruins reveal the characteristic form of a peristyle villa, with a gallery of columns around a courtyard. The excavations brought to light an extensive Roman villa with adjacent buildings. The villa ruins of Milreu show that the area was already populated in Roman times.
