= Roman ruins of Milreu =

Roman Ruins of Milreu
- Roman Ruins of Estói
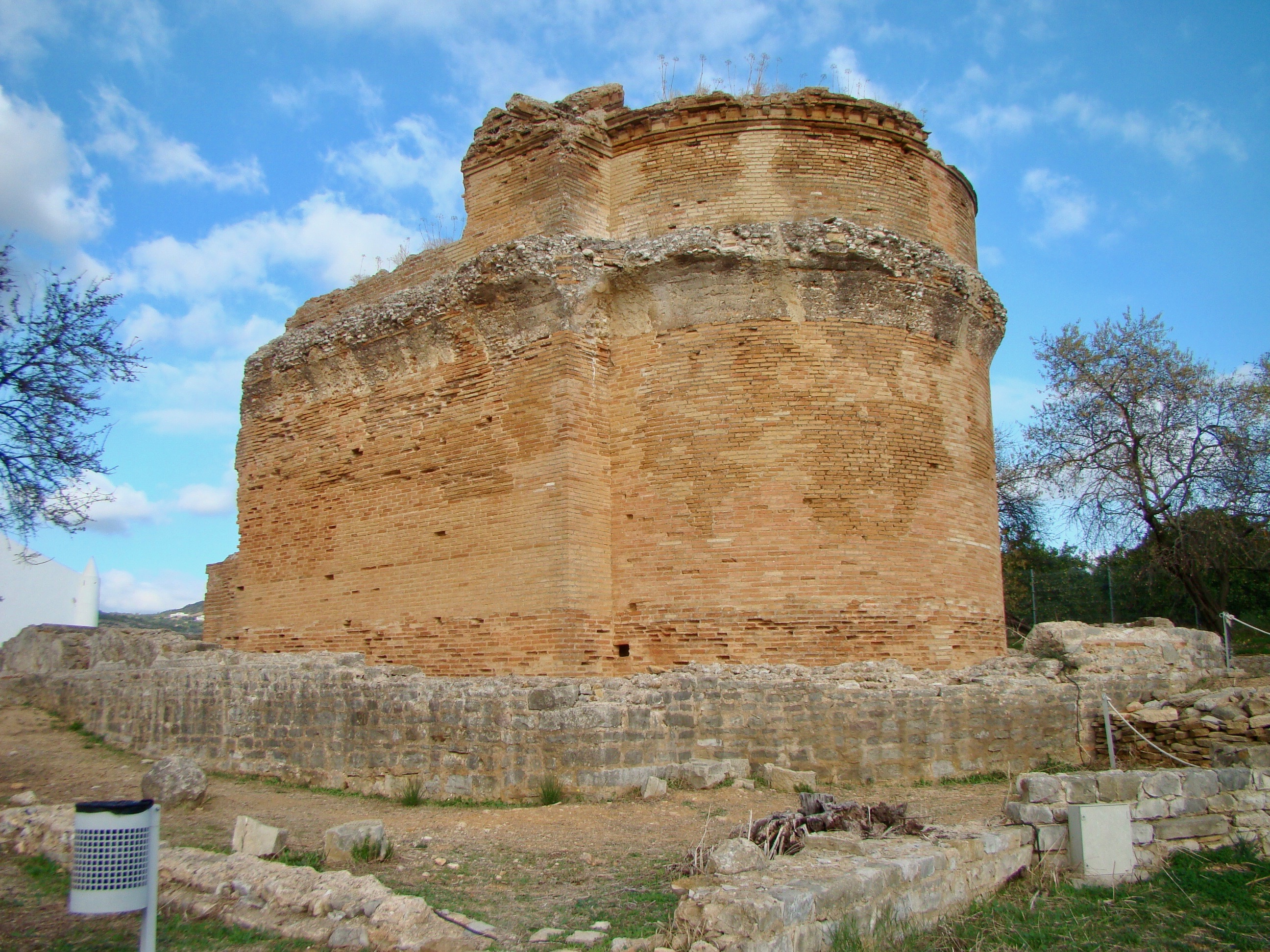
- The rear of the water temple
- Interactive map of Roman Ruins of Milreu
- 37°5′42.2″N 7°54′14.3″W
- Type: Ruins
- Cultures: Roman
- Associated with: Roman Paganism, Christianity, Islam
- Location: Faro, Algarve, Portugal

History
- Built: Between the 1st and 4th centuries AD
- Abandoned: 10th Century AD

Site notes
- Archaeologists: Estácio da Veiga
- Discovered: 1877
- Owner: Portuguese Republic
- Public access: Public EN2-6, between Coiro da Burra and Estoi, alongside the junction between Faro da Via do Infante, 9 kilometres (5.6 mi) from Faro

The Roman ruins of Milreu (Portuguese: Ruinas Romanas de Milreu) are the remains of an important Roman villa rustica located in the civil parish of Estói in the municipality of Faro, Portugal, classified as a Monumento Nacional (National Monument). The Milreu ruins constitute the most prominent and well preserved evidence of Roman presence in the Algarve. They are mainly composed of the remnants of a once luxurious villa with annexed thermae and several surrounding buildings, including a temple, mausoleum and industrial and commercial structures. The archaeological site still preserves part of the once exuberant mosaics (mostly maritime motifs) that decorated the floor and walls of the villa. A 16th century house is also located in the area, alongside an interpretation centre.

== History ==
The town was first constructed and inhabited in the 1st century, with traces of continuous occupation until the 10th century. Comparable to a large number of rustic villas in Italy and Spain, Milreu distinguished itself as a luxury complex due to its extensive and pompous mosaic decorations, ancient imperial busts, a temple devoted to a water deity, a stunning garden winery and oil processing mills.

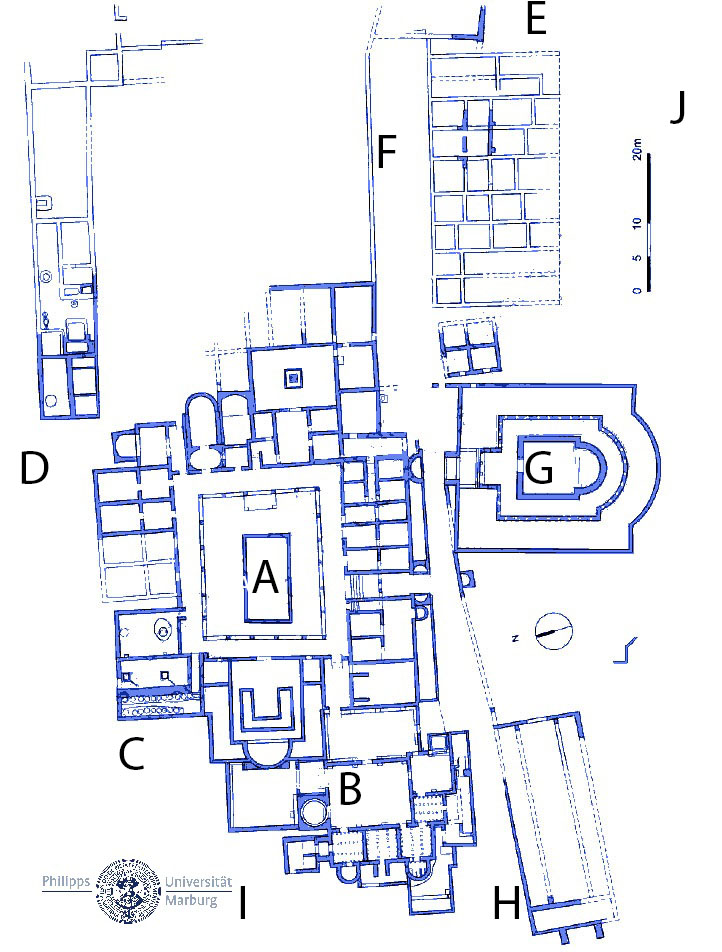
Map of the urban area of Milreu. Description: A - Residencial building; B - Thermae; C - Olive oil mills; D - Wine House; E - Mausoleum; F - Workers's dwellings; G - Temple; H - Commercial Building; I - Gardened area

The house was reorganized at the end of the 3rd century around a large central peristyle so that columns surrounded an open courtyard with garden and thermae. The 4th century entrance of the villa was monumental, the peristyle and baths having been embellished with mosaics representing marine fauna. To the south stood an imposing building of worship to an aquatic deity, that in the following century would be transformed into a Paleochristan temple.

Later excavations emphasized a long tradition of worship in Milreu, demonstrating that after the 6th century the building was transformed into a Christian church; the courtyard was also used as a cemetery during the Muslim occupation. In the first half of the 10th century, the vaults were ruined at the site and the area was abandoned.

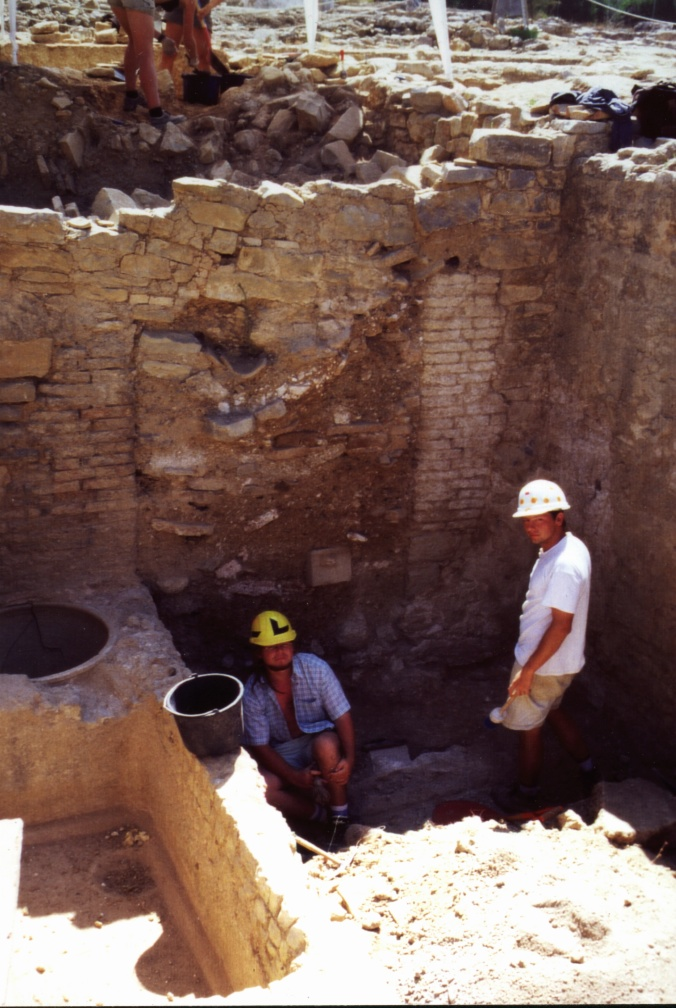
German archaeologists during excavations at Milreu in the late 1990s.

The construction of the rural house occurred in the 16th century.

The ruins were discovered in 1877 by Portuguese archaeologist Estácio da Veiga. The late-19th-century excavations by da Veiga made it possible to unravel mosaic works that were buried beneath the dwelling, as well as wine-processing facilities.

On June the 1st, 1992, the property was placed under the protection of the Instituto Português do Património Arquitetónico (Portuguese Institute for Architectural Patrimony). The site was included in the 1999 Programa de Valorização e Divulgação Turística (Tourism Appreciation and Dissemination Program), as part of the Itinerários Arqueológicos do Alentejo e Algarve project of the Ministério do Comércio e Turismo and Secretaria de Estado da Cultura. On the 23rd of June 2001, a public tender was issued for remodelling the 16th-century rural house, to construct an interpretative centre, which was won by architects Ditza Reis and Pedro Serra Alves. Work on the site included civil construction and electrification, excavation, conservation and restoration of the walls. The site was re-inaugurated on 19 November 2003, with the opening of a permanent exposition.

As of 20 December 2007, the property was placed under the authority of the Direção Regional da Cultura do Algarve (dispatch 1130/2007; Diário da República, Série II, 245).

== Architecture ==
The site is located in an isolated rural area, behind a bridge, west of the cemetery and roadway.

The site includes a seigniorial house, organized around a central patio, change rooms in the east, temple in the south and agricultural installations. The central patio consisted of a peristyle with 22 columns. A thermal spa includes a sequence of apodyterium, frigidarium, circular bathing pool, tepidarium and caldarium decorated with mosaics (one with oblong fish designs). The ruins of an aquatic sanctuary include an altar that served as paleo-Christian church, as indicated from the presence of a baptismal pool and a small mausoleum on the patio.

Nearby the ruins is the 16th-century rural house, used as an interpretative center, that includes a cylindrical buttresses along the outer corners.

== Interpretative Center ==
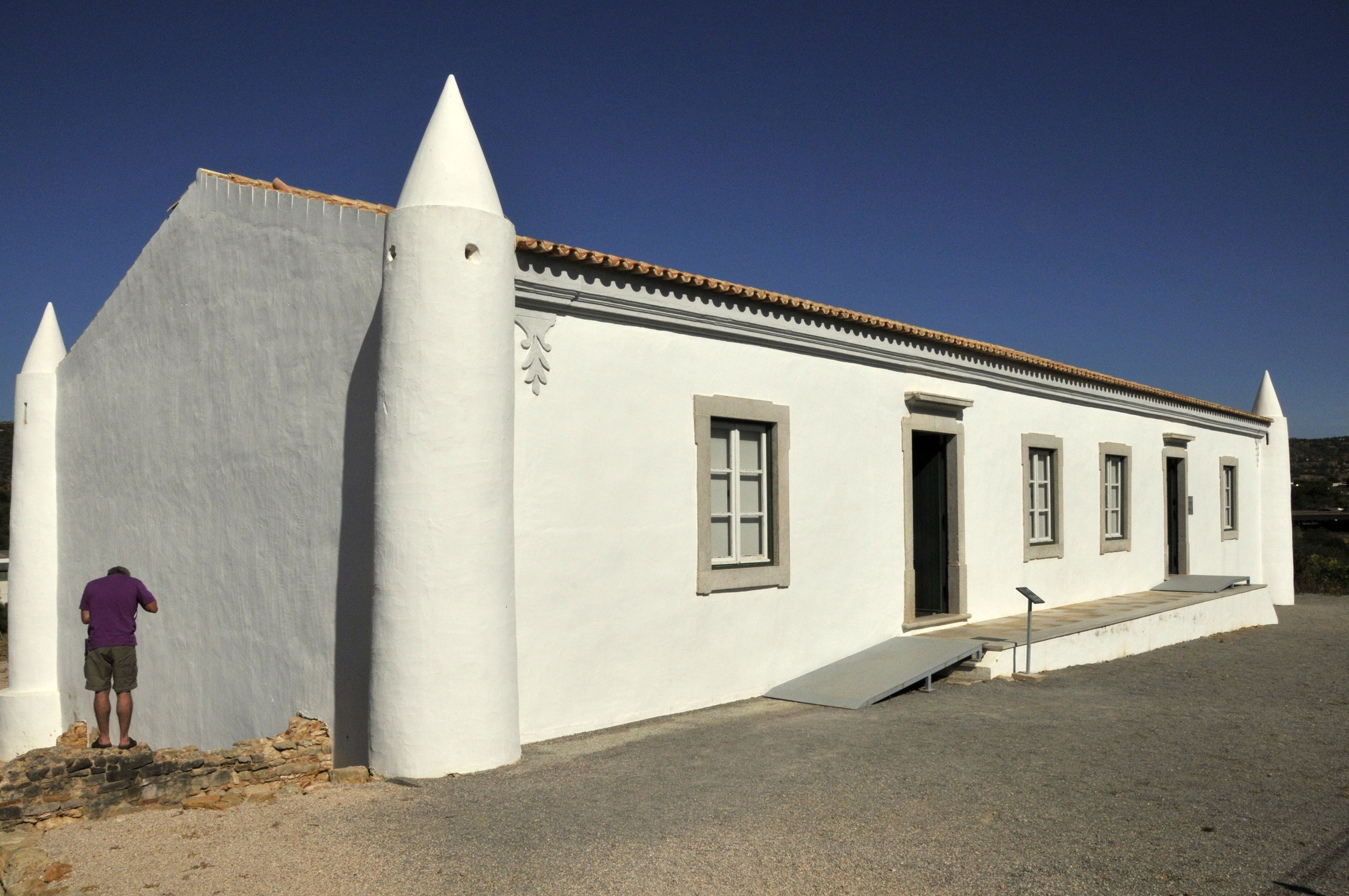
The 16th-century rural farmhouse redesigned to act as the interpretative centre

== Gallery ==
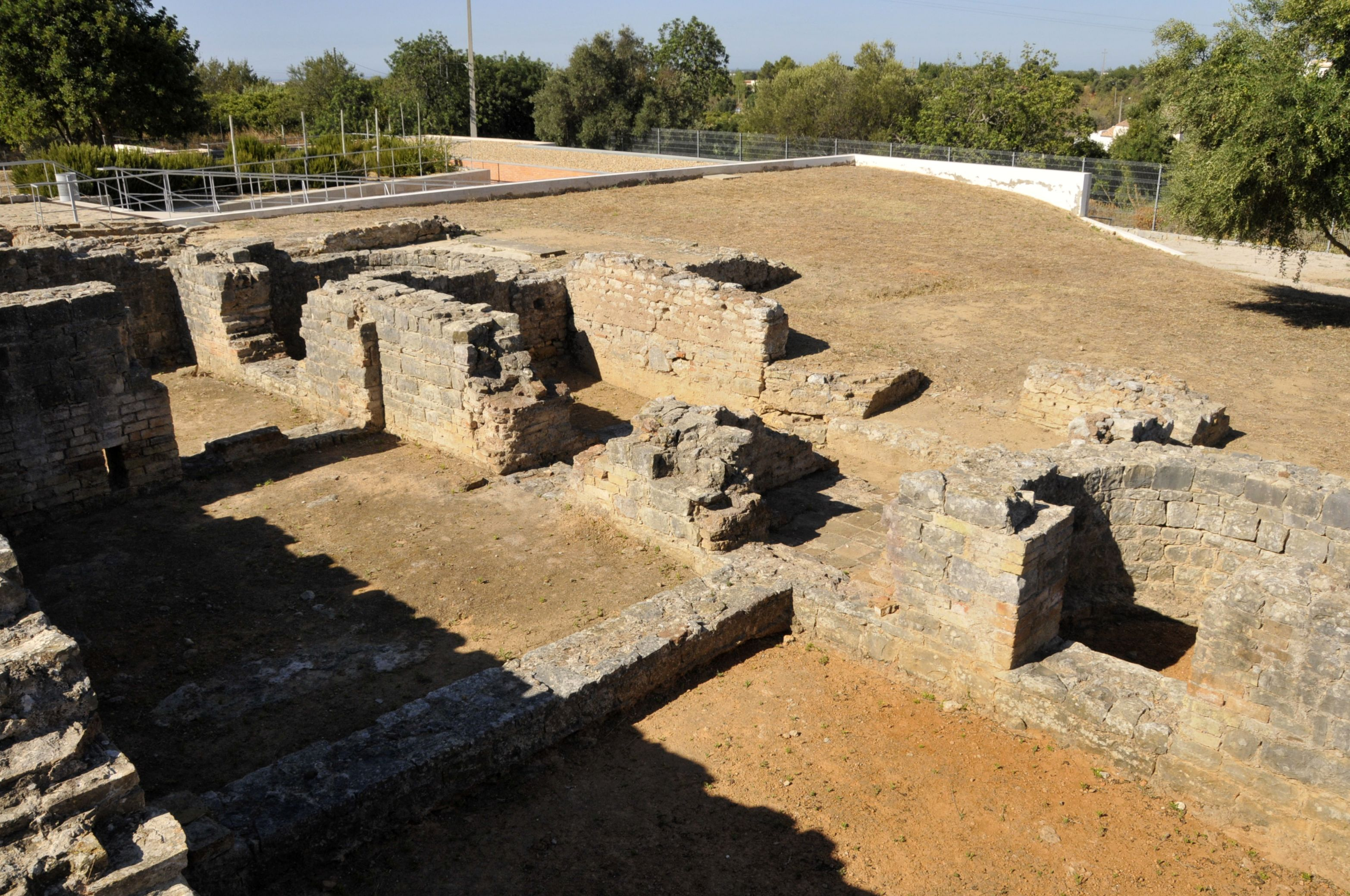
The exposed walls from the buildings in Milreu

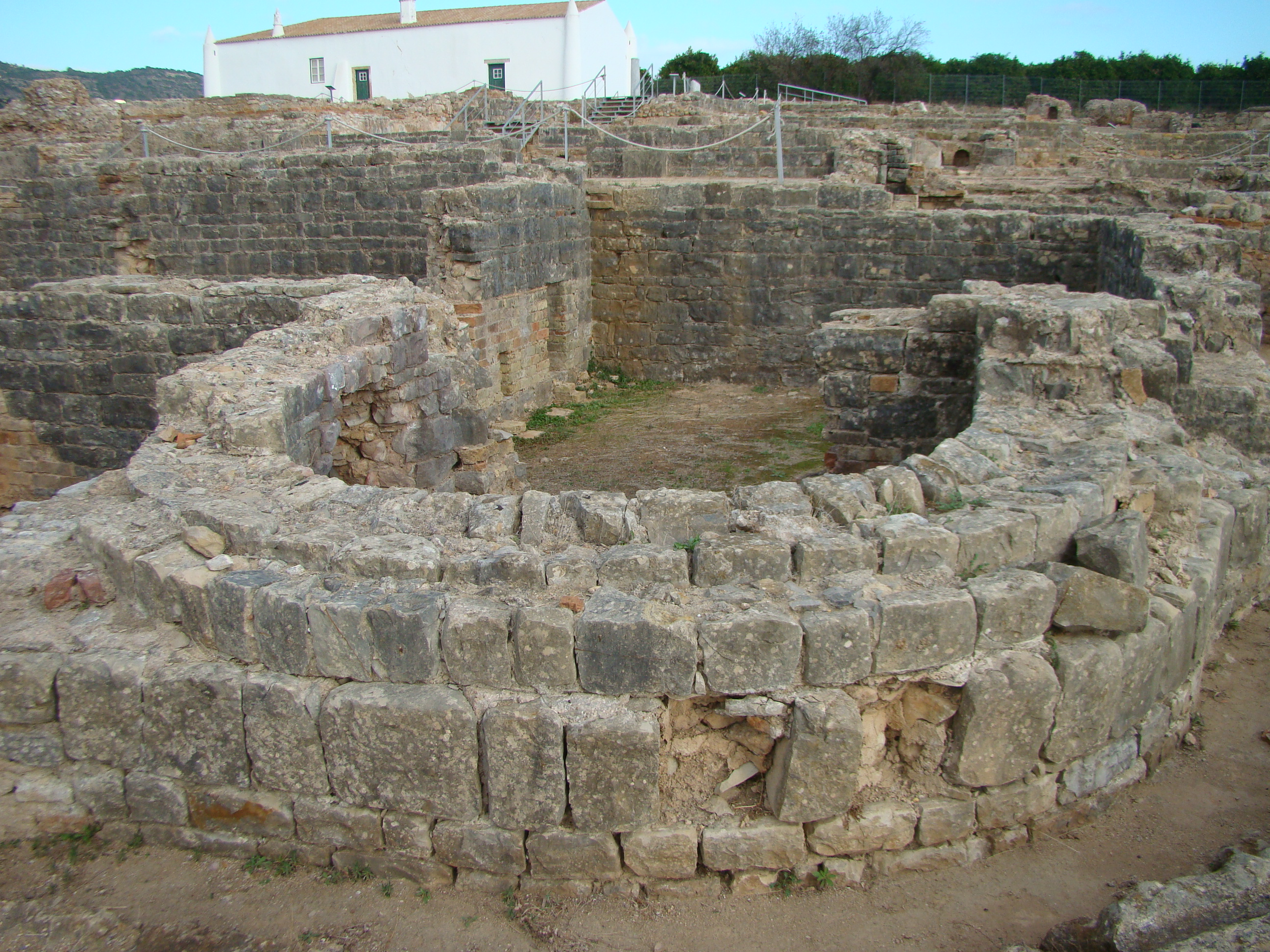
Part of the Thermae

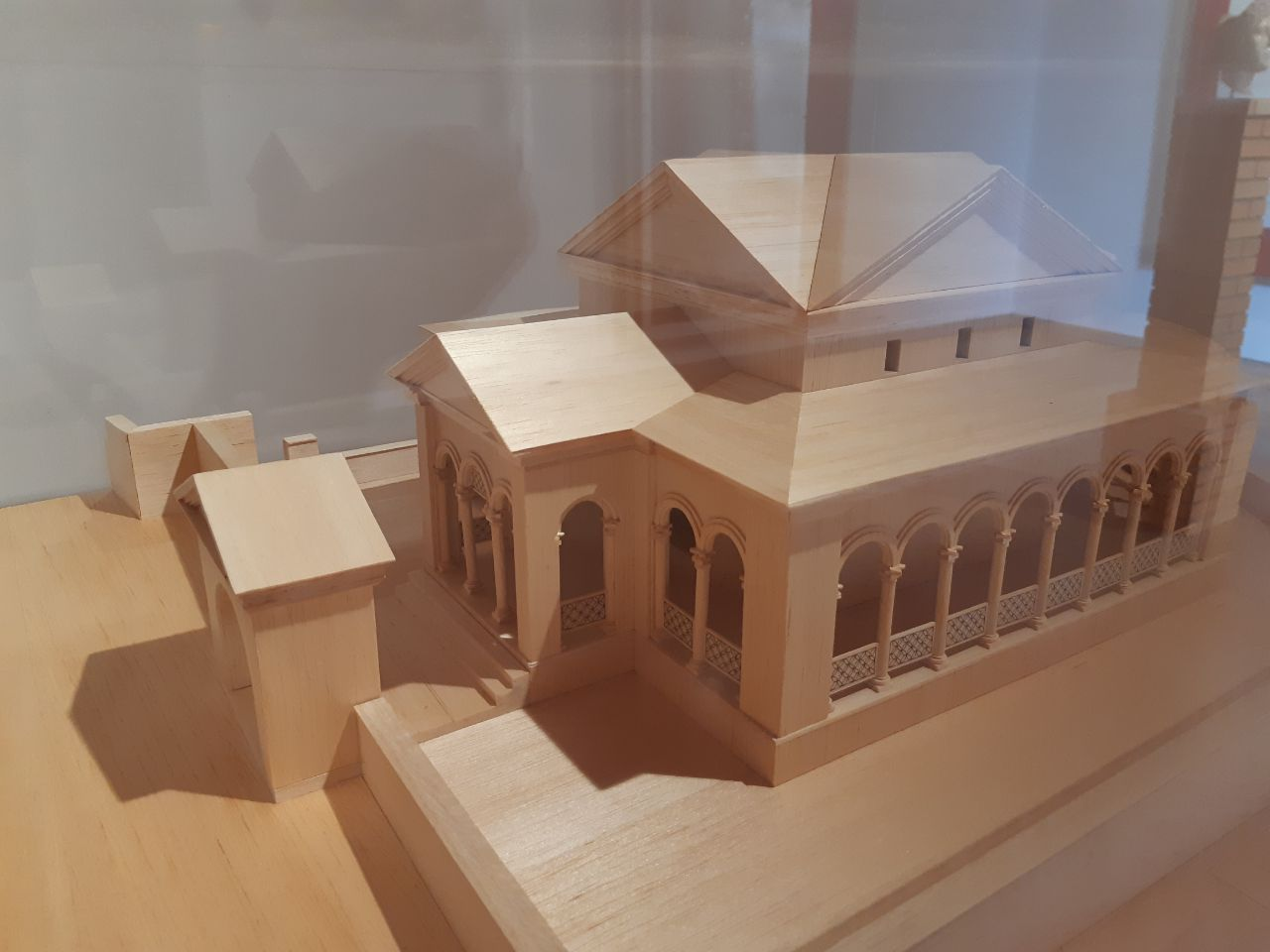
Possible representation of how the temple looked like

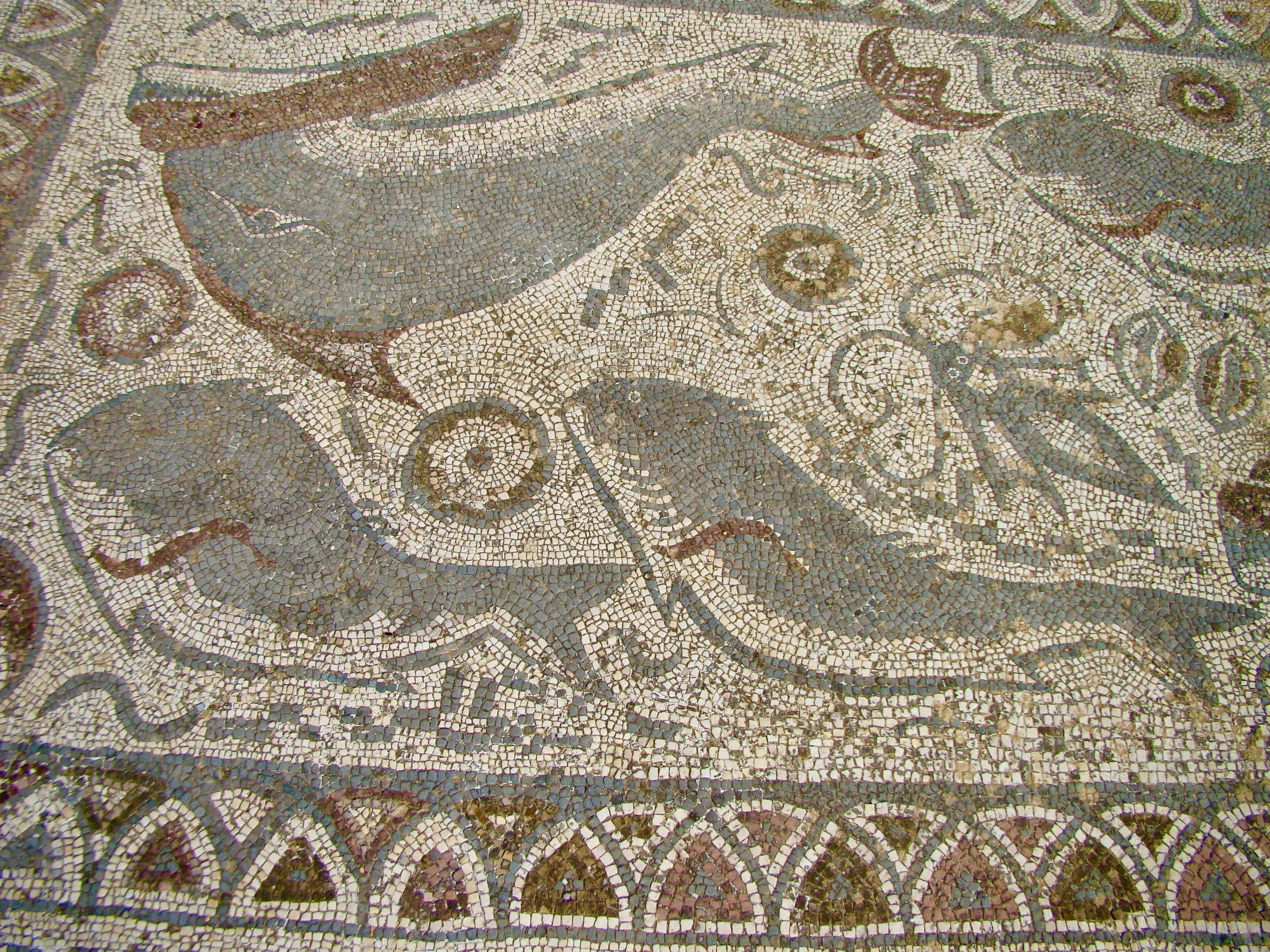
Floor mosaic

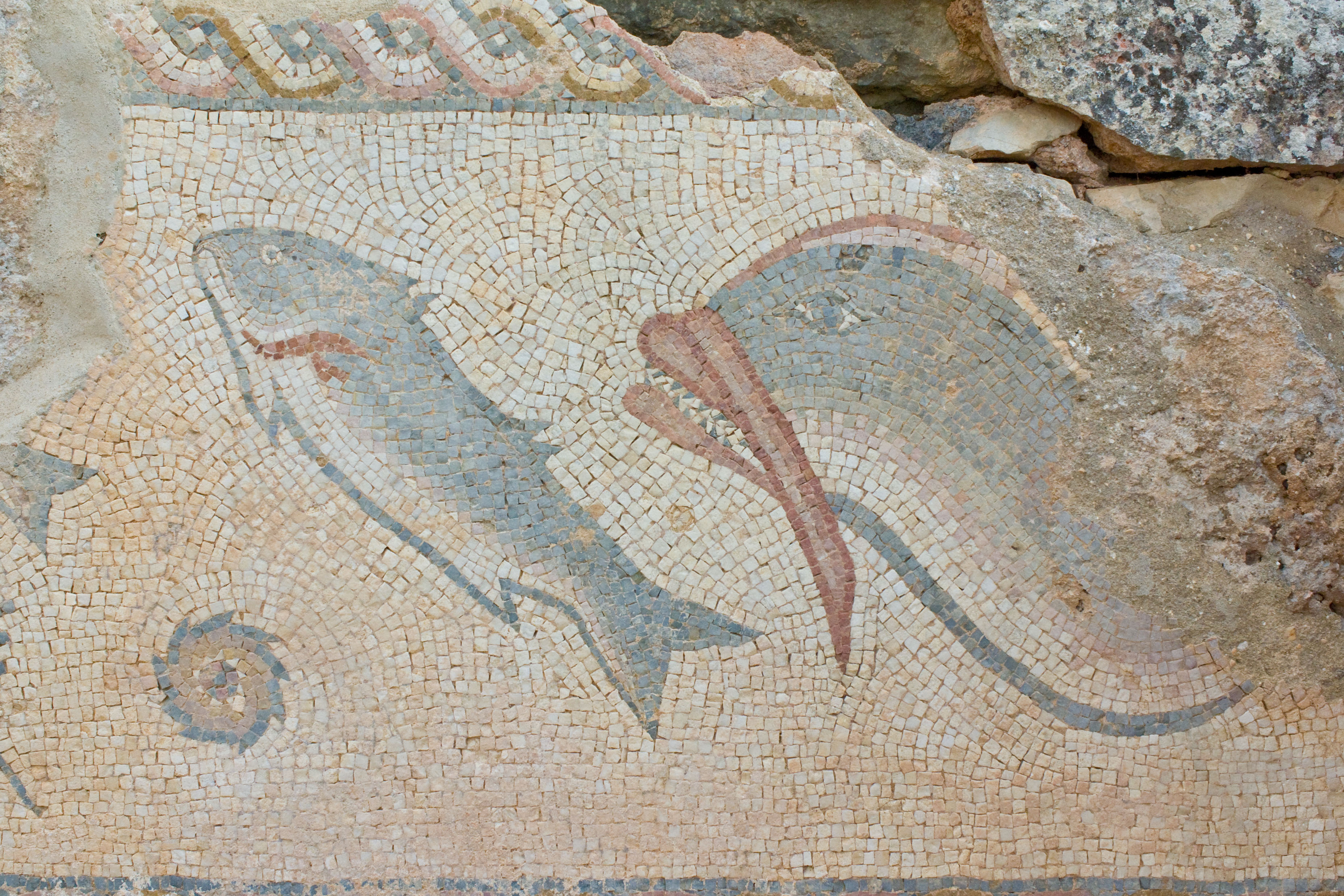
Wall mosaic

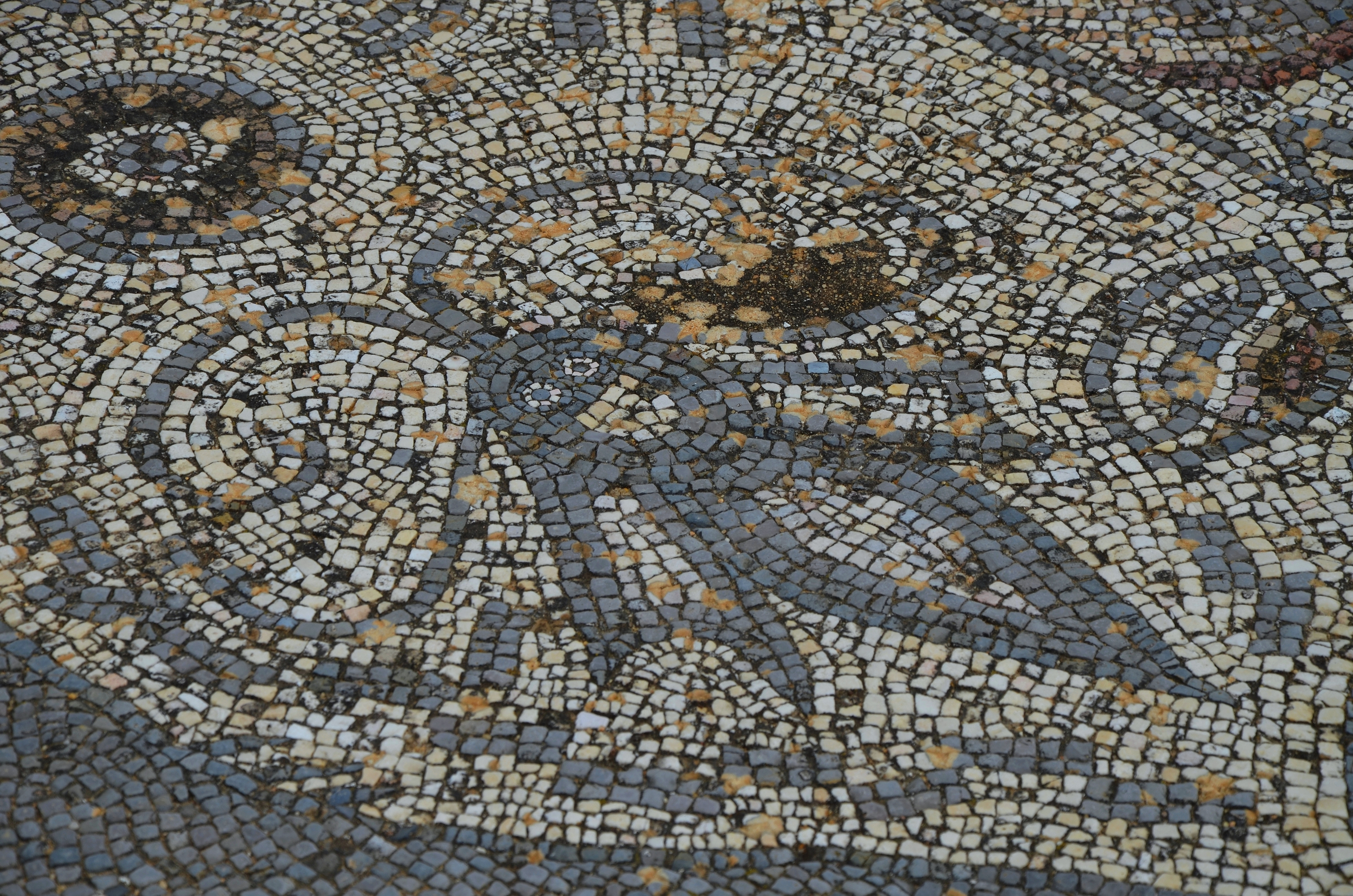
Floor mosaic depicting a squid

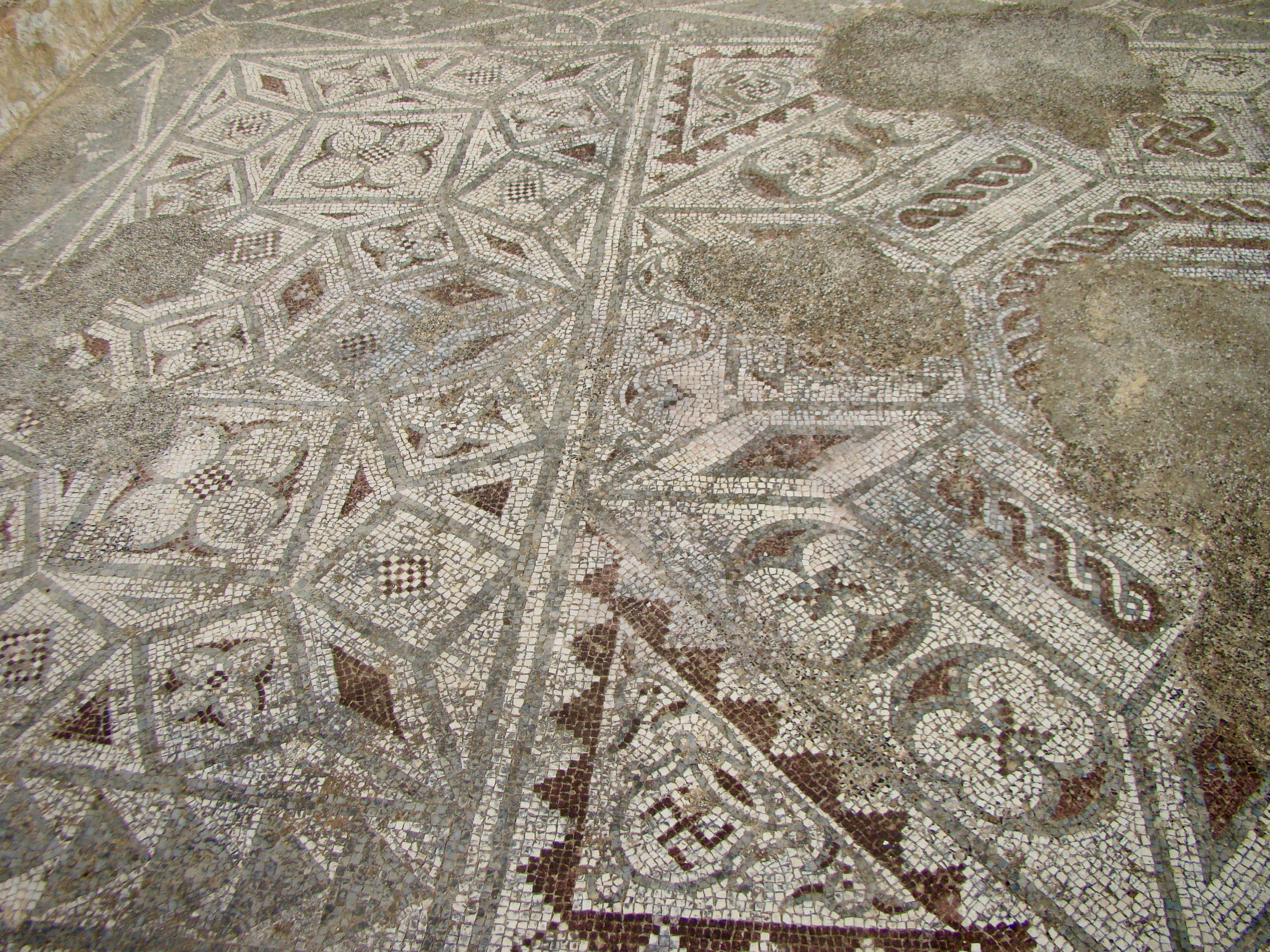
Mosaics at Milreu

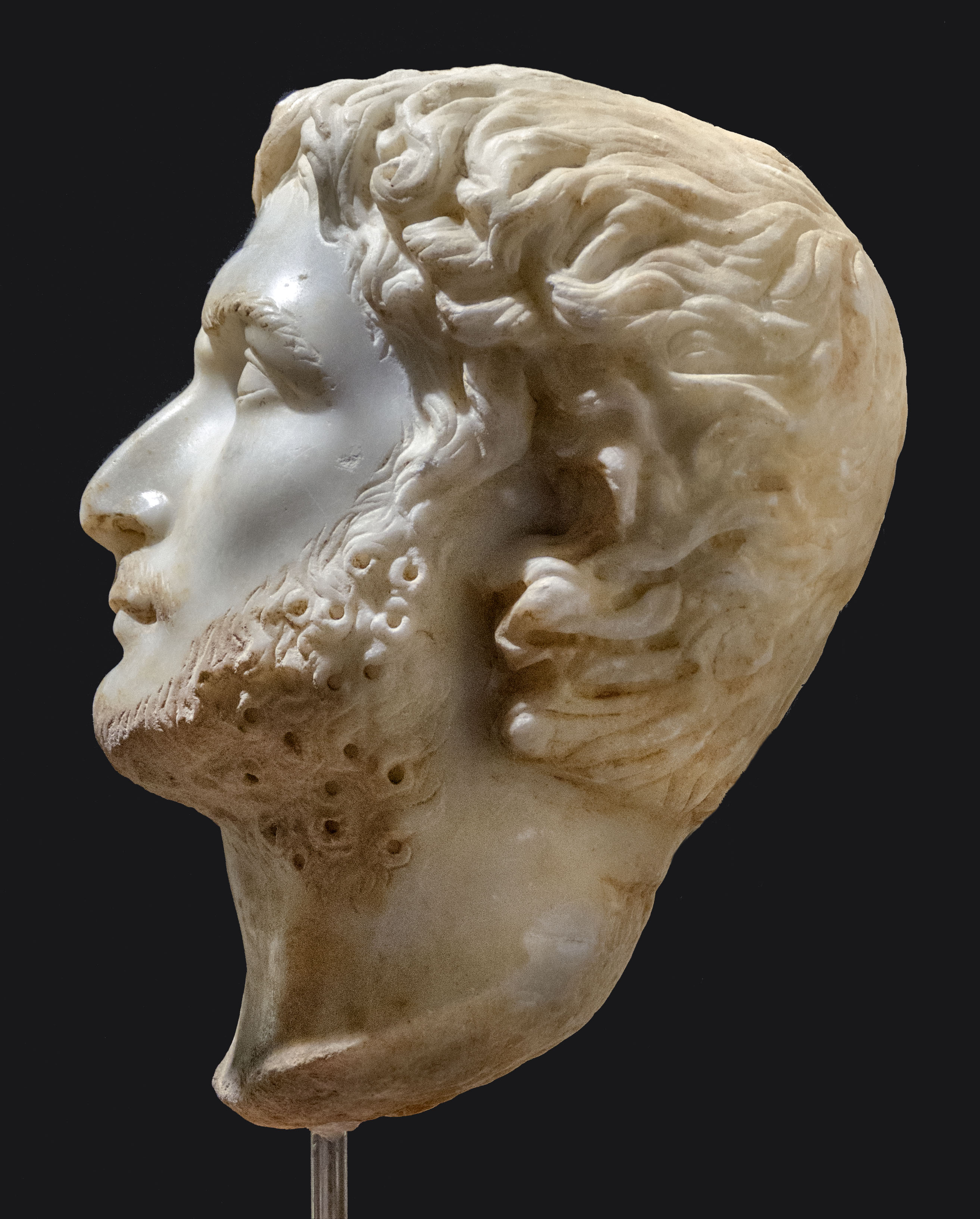
Bust of Gallienus

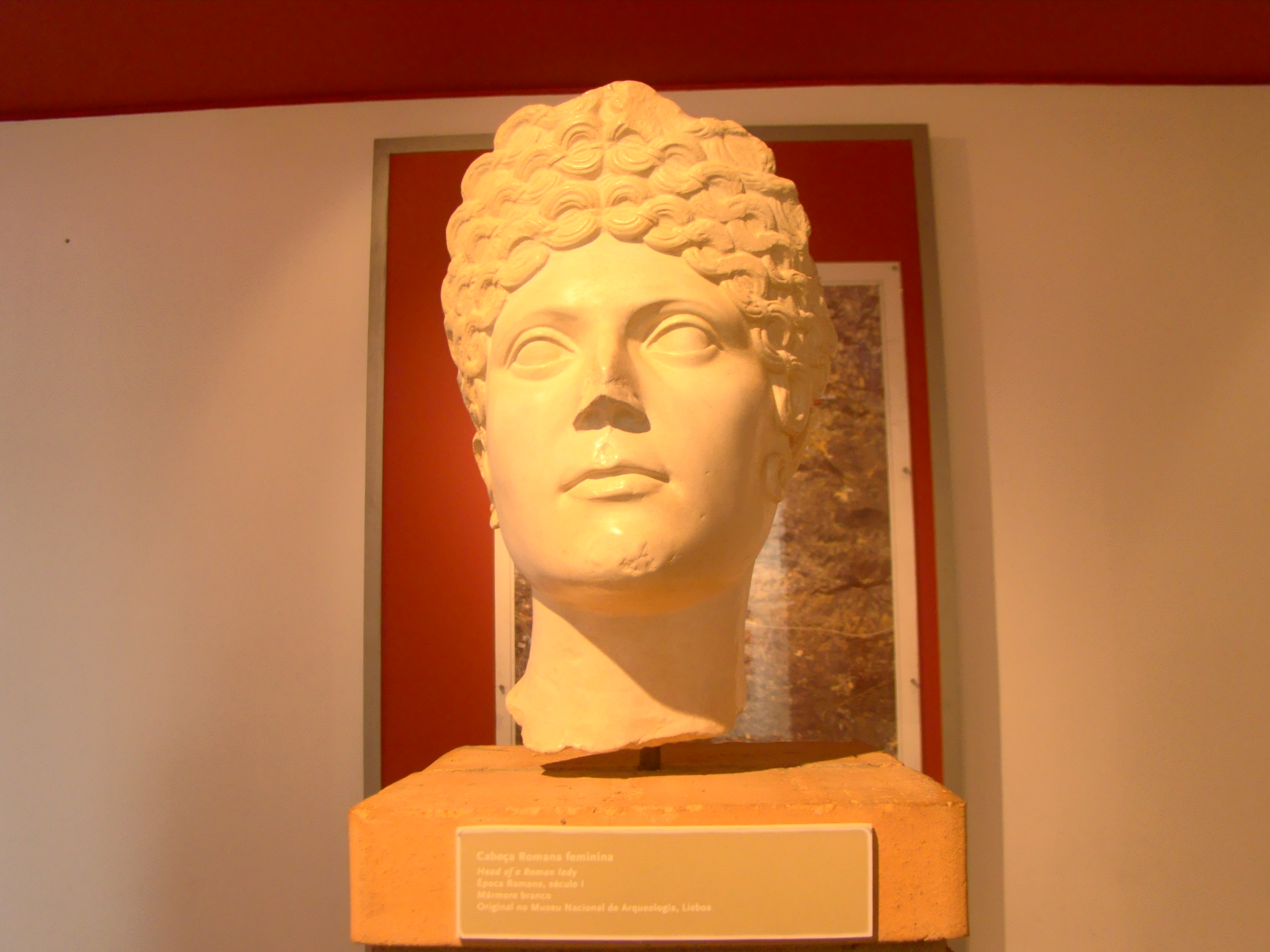
Bust of a woman at Milreu's interpretation centre

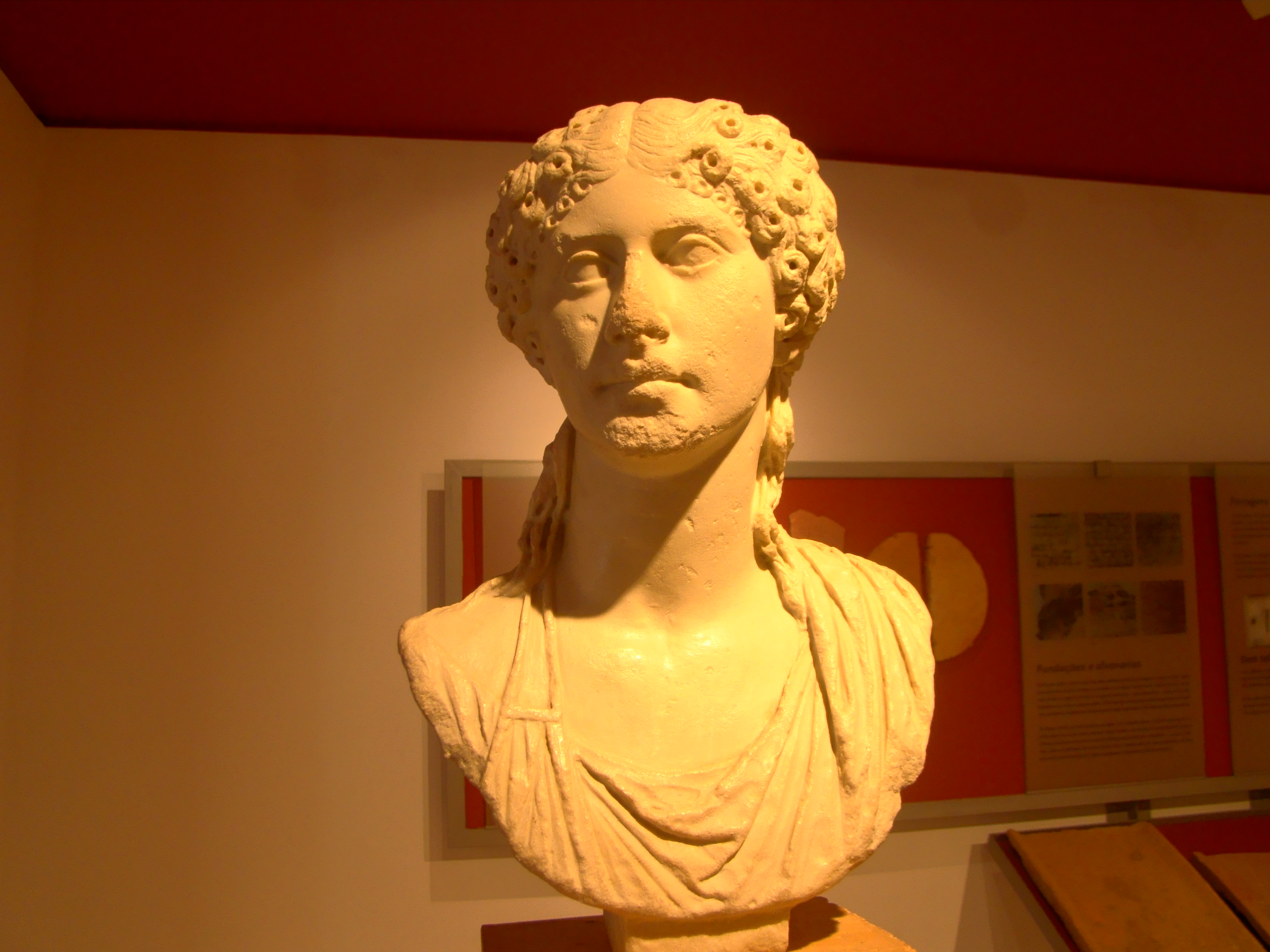
The bust of Agrippina the Younger found in the property

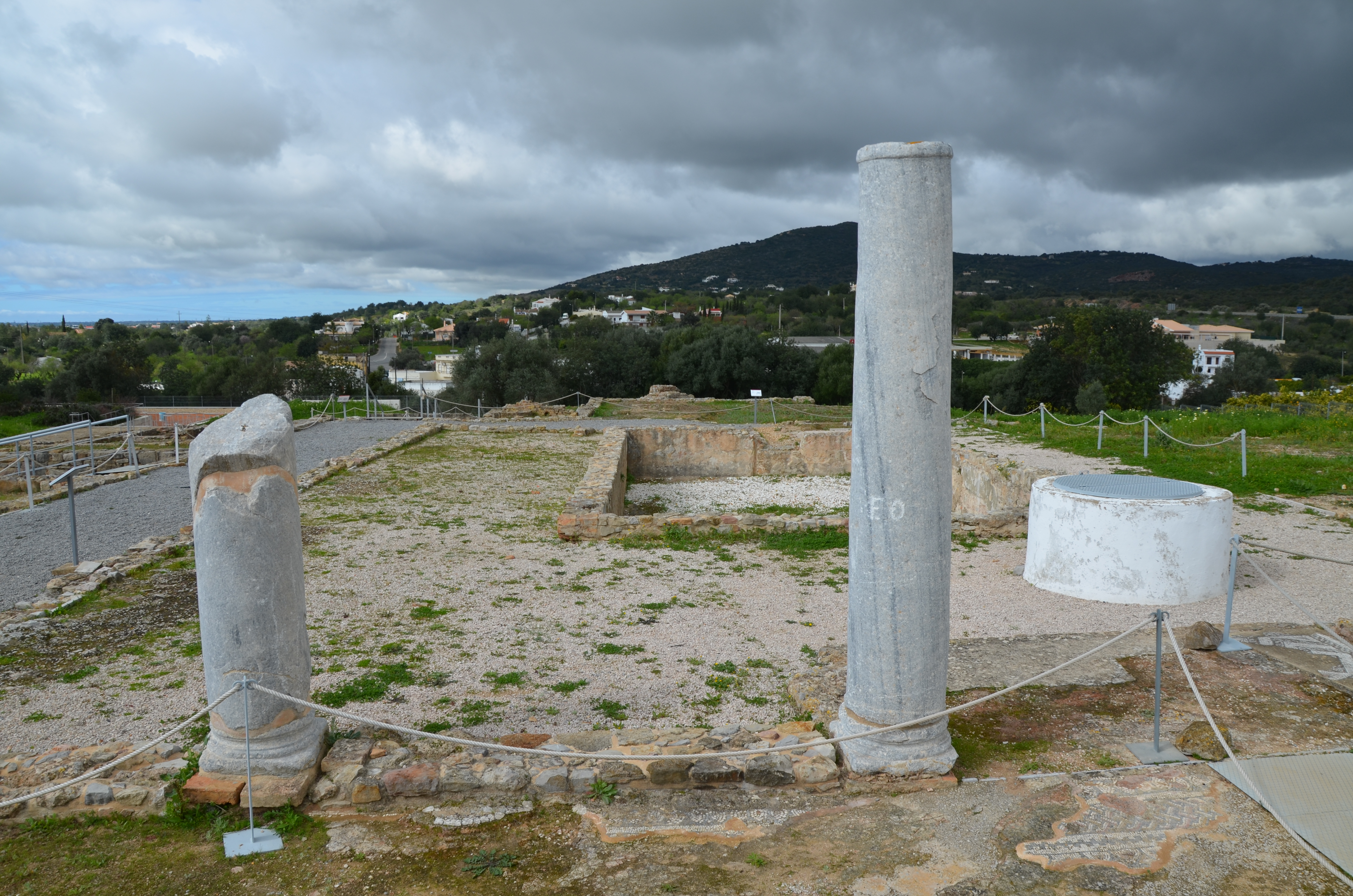
Two standing columns that composed the Peristyles
