= Murtosa Municipal Chamber =

Legislative body of Murtosa

Coordinates: 40.74992°N 8.65063°W

Murtosa Municipal Chamber Câmara Municipal da Murtosa
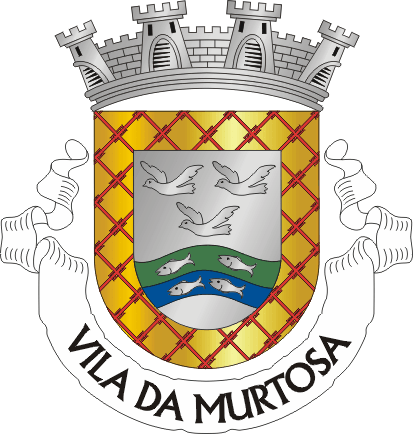
- Coat of arms of the town of Murtosa

Type
- Type: Câmara municipal
- Term limits: 3

History
- Founded: 29 October 1926; 99 years ago

Leadership
- President: Januário Vieira da Cunha, PSD since 20 October 2021
- Vice President: Daniel Henriques de Bastos, PSD since 20 October 2021

Structure
- Seats: 5
- Political groups: Municipal Executive (4) PSD (4) Opposition (1) PS (1)
- Length of term: Four years

Elections
- Last election: 26 September 2021
- Next election: Sometime between 22 September and 14 October 2025

Meeting place
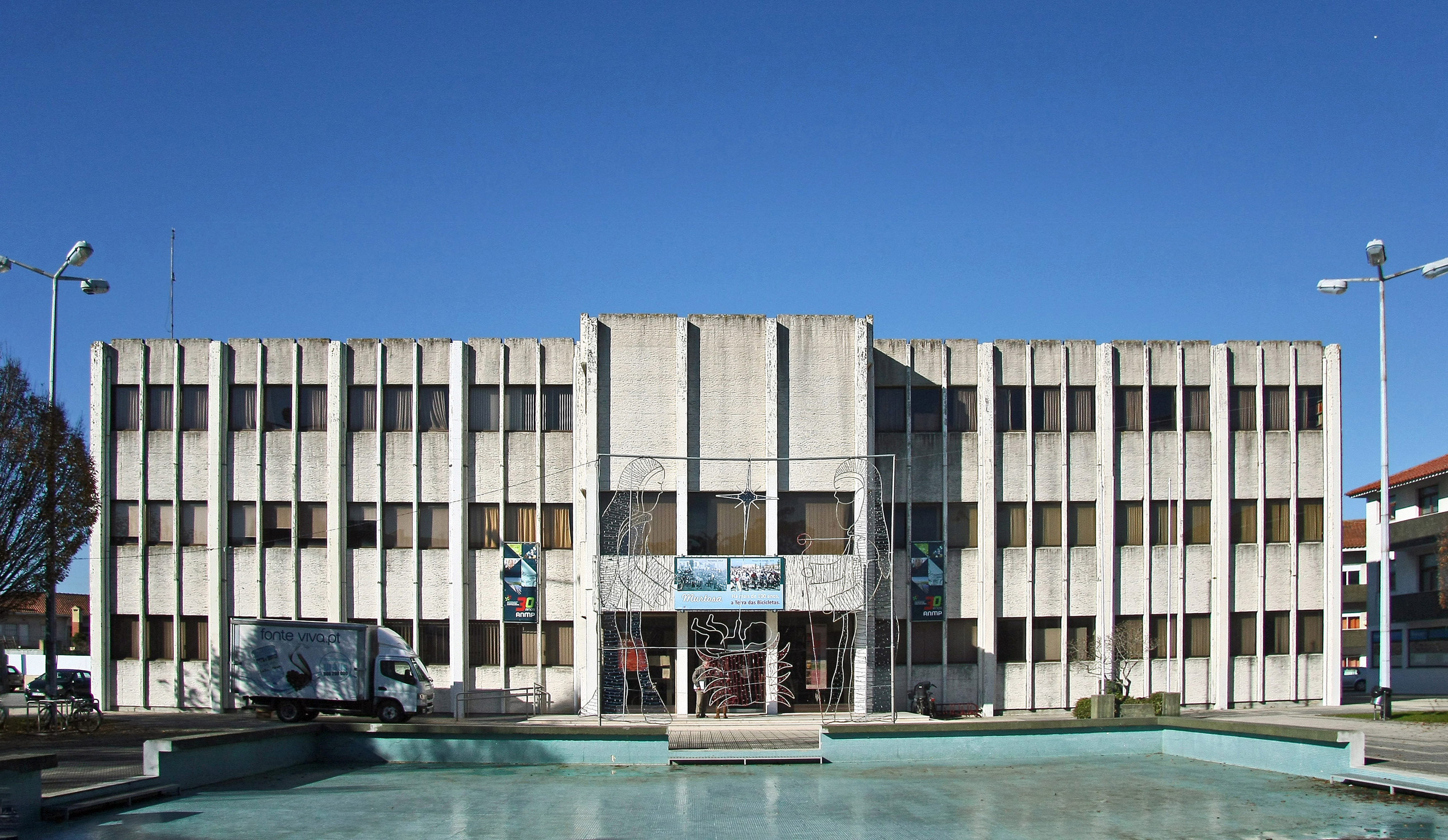
- Paços do Concelho da Murtosa

Website
- www.cm-murtosa.pt

The Murtosa Municipal Chamber (Portuguese: Câmara Municipal da Murtosa) is the administrative authority in the municipality of Murtosa, Portugal. It has 4 freguesias in its area of jurisdiction and is based in the town of Murtosa, on the Aveiro District. These freguesias are: Bunheiro; Monte; Murtosa and Torreira.

The Murtosa City Council is made up of 5 councillors, representing, currently, two different political forces. The first candidate on the list with the most votes in a municipal election or, in the event of a vacancy, the next candidate on the list, takes office as President of the Municipal Chamber.

== List of the Presidents of the Municipal Chamber of Murtosa ==
- António Morais da Fonseca – (1976–1985)
- Manuel Cunha da Silva – (1985)
- Manuel Portugal da Fonseca – (1985–1989)
- Augustos dos Santos Leite – (1989–1997)
- António Maria Sousa – (1997–2011)
- Joaquim dos Santos Baptista – (2011–2025)
- Januário Vieira da Cunha – (2025)

(The list is incomplete)
