= Castle of Belmonte =

Castle of Belmonte may refer to:

- Castle of Belmonte (Belmonte), medieval castle located in Belmonte, Portugal
- Castle of Belmonte (Cuenca), medieval castle in Cuenca, Spain
