= Maria Albertina =

Maria Albertina Soares de Paiva, known professionally as Maria Albertina (5 January 1909 – 27 March 1985), was a Portuguese fado singer and actor.

== Biography ==
Maria Albertina was born on 5 January 1909. She was the daughter of the seafarer Domingos da Silva Paiva, a native of Estarreja (Bunheiro), and fishmonger Iria de Oliveira Soares Presas, also from the parish and municipality of Ovar. She began singing in her hometown as a young woman. She launched her professional artistic career in Lisbon after being discovered by conductor Macedo de Brito.

She debuted on 16 July 1930 in the operetta História do Fado, alongside established names such as Berta Cardoso and Maria das Neves. She also participated in Sardinha Assada, O Dia da Espiga, and O Coração de Alfama. She worked with promoter António Macedo at Parque Mayer and was a member of the Theatre Artists' Union.

On 22 May 1934, she married José Rodrigues Prieto (Socorro, Lisbon, c. 1900) in a civil ceremony in Lisbon. Prieto, a commercial employee, was a divorcee since 1929 and the son of Francisca de Jesus, a native of Covilhã. At the time of their marriage, the couple already had a daughter, Maria Teresa Soares Prieto (Lisbon, 22 April 1932 – 22 October 1996). José and Maria Albertina were divorced following a court ruling on 9 March 1942. Maria Albertina was also the mother of the broadcaster Cândido Mota, born in 1943 from a later relationship.

In cinema, she appeared in A Canção de Lisboa (1933), Bocage (1936), and Vendaval Maravilhoso (1949).

Her greatest musical hits included "Voz do Povo", "Tricanas de Ovar", "Fado Meu Filho", and "Bailarico Saloio". During the last 20 years of her life, she sang at the restaurant O Faia in Lisbon's Bairro Alto.

Maria Albertina died in the parish of Alto do Pina, Lisbon, on 27 March 1985. She had been in poor health following a stroke two years prior. She was buried in the Artists' Section of the Prazeres Cemetery, and her estate was donated to the National Museum of Theatre and Dance.

== Tributes ==
In Lisbon, the street Rua Maria Albertina was named in her honor by municipal decree on 25 June 1985, located in the Bairro Municipal da Cruz Vermelha, in the parish of Lumiar.

In 1998, a compilation CD gathering some of her songs was released by Movieplay as part of the collection O Melhor dos Melhores (No. 77).
