= Pousada da Ria =

Hostel of Ria
- Pousada da Ria
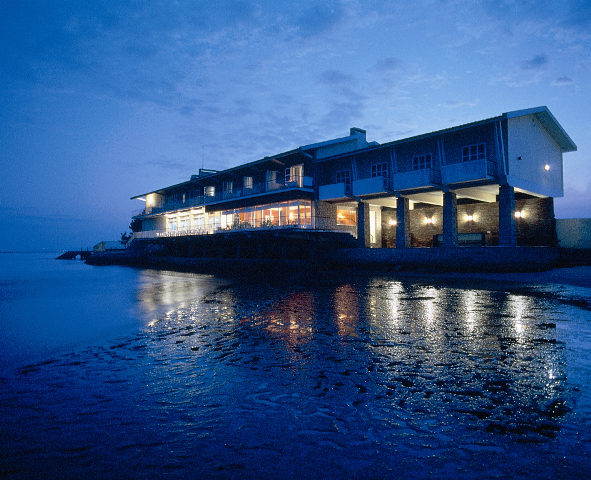
- A view of the Pousada da Ria after sunset, along the waters of the Ria estuary
- Interactive map of the Hostel of Ria area

General information
- Type: Hostel
- Architectural style: Modern
- Location: Torreira, Murtosa, Portugal
- Coordinates: 40°43′8.46″N 8°41′54.88″W
- Opened: 20th century

Technical details
- Material: Granite

Website
- www.pousadas.pt

The Pousada da Ria (Portuguese: Pousada da Ria/Pousada of Murtosa) is situated in the civil parish of Torreira in the municipality of Murtosa, district of Aveiro. It is part of the Pousadas de Portugal network of hostels, classified under the "Pousada of Nature" designation.

== History ==
The hostel was constructed in 1959 by the Serviços de Construção e Conservação (Construction and Conservation Services), and inaugurated in 1960. The hostel was integrated into the network of Pousadas de Portugal, under the a group of Pousadas Natureza (nature hostels). It was included as part of the first phase in the construction new hostels; it was the second constructed in the Beira-Mar series. This includes several projects, among them Nazaré (Ruy Jervis d'Athouguia) and Portinho da Arrábida (a project adapted by Leonardo Castro Freire), but, the project was never brought to term, except Aveiro and the Pousada do Infante (in Sagres).

On 24 August 2006, the building was in process of classification (per Decree-Law 173/2006, Diário da República, Série 1, 16), which revoked the special protection zone created on 18 November 1932 (Decree 21/875), that regulated buildings of architectural importance. On 23 March 2009, the DRCCentro proposed the closing of the brief to classify the building, which was supported, on the 30 March 2009, by a similar closing by the director of IGESPAR.

== Architecture ==
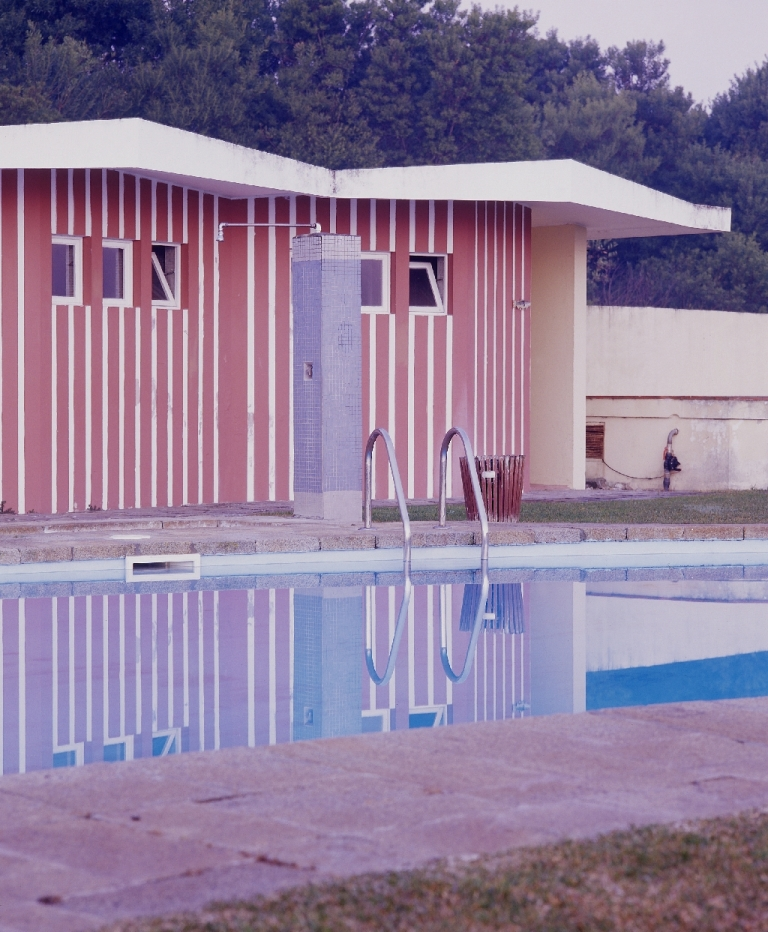
View poolside in the Pousada da Ria

The Pousada is located along the southern arm of the isthmus between the municipality of Murtosa and Aveiro, between the beaches of São Jacinto (along the coast) and the protected natural reserve of the Ria estuary. It is a zone of transitional watercourses, between the interior waterways and the Atlantic coast. It is situated in the civil parish of Torreira known for its local architecture that includes the Chapel of São Paio and the parochial church.

The hostel conforms to a "L"-shape plan, of articulated spaces and covered in tile. This includes a principal 2-storey body that runs parallel to the river, with various varandas and terraces over the water. Along the same orientation is a body that is one-storey, but withdrawn, that corresponds to the laundry and ancillary annexes. At the intersection, is a narrow, two-storey body with the ground floor occupied by support services and the second-floor by guest rooms. The Pousada includes 20 rooms (including two suites) with views of the Ria de Aveiro, where it is common to observe the traditional work of the Moliceiros (the fishermen that guide the traditional Aveiro boats) and the fishing along the Ria. The characteristics of the Ria also allow it to be a prime spot for boat trips and water sports.

This pousada has no real historical significance; in fact, it is more along the lines of a two-storey inn and very hotel-like.

== See also ==
- Pousadas de Portugal
