= Pousadas de Portugal =

Pestana Group hotels

- Industry: Hospitality, hotels
- Founded: 1942
- Headquarters: Lisbon, Portugal
- Owner: Pestana Group
- Website: www.pousadas.pt

Pousadas de Portugal (European Portuguese pronunciation: [poˈzaðɐʒ ðɨ puɾtuˈɣal]) is a chain of luxury, traditional or historical hotels in Portugal. Formerly run by the Portuguese State, they are now run by the Pestana Group, which in September 2003 won a public bid for the sale of 37.6% of parent company Enatur and for a 40-year running concession. It is a member of the Historic Hotels of Europe.

The Pousadas were envisioned and created in the early 1940s by António Ferro, head of the National Propaganda Secretariat and also a poet and playwright, who had the idea of creating hotels that were both rustic and genuinely Portuguese. His first Pousada was built in Elvas, in the Alentejo, which would be the first of what Ferro called "small hotels that look nothing like hotels". This Pousada is no longer active. There are now 44 Pousadas installed in historic buildings.

The Portuguese word pousada means "hostel" or "inn". In Portugal, the use of the word is registered as a trademark and reserved for the use of the Pousadas de Portugal and also of the Pousadas de Juventude (Portuguese state-run youth hostel chain associated to the Hostelling International). A similar small charming, nature or historical hotel in Portugal that is not part of the Pousadas de Portugal chain is classified as estalagem, a word which also means "hostel" or "inn".

== History ==
=== Origins ===
Created by the Law 31.259 of 1 May 1941, by António Ferro's initiative. The first hotel was inaugurated in 1942, in Elvas, Alentejo, a region that has several historical pousadas. Other Regional Pousadas were inaugurated, always with a small number of rooms and a special attention to the local gastronomy.

In the 1950s, a new designation was added, Historical Pousadas, these hotels were installed in historical monuments and buildings, castles, convents and monasteries. The first Pousada created under this new designation was Pousada do Castelo in Óbidos.

In 1995, the American Society of Travel Agents and the Smithsonian Foundation, awarded the Pousadas de Portugal the annual prize for the institutions around the world with an active part in the protection of cultural and environmental heritage for touristic purposes.

=== Privatization ===
In 2003, due to the accumulation of negative results for more than a decade, the Portuguese Government led by Durão Barroso decided to privatize 49% of Enatur's capital, as well as to concede the management of the Pousadas to the winning group.

The winner was the PPG – Pestana Pousadas Group, formed by Pestana Group (59.8%), CGD Group (25%), Oriente Foundation (15%) and two more companies with 0.2% (Viagens Abreu and Portimar). On 1 September 2003, PPG became responsible for the management of the Pousadas hotel chain for a period of 20 years.

=== The future ===
In Portugal, PPG intends to continue the expansion of the hotel chain. Two new Pousadas are planned for 2012, the Pousada de Cascais (on the coast near Lisbon) and the Pousada da Serra da Estrela (in the mountainous central part of the country). The Pousada de Cascais is to be situated in the old citadelle in Cascais to a design by the Gonçalo Byrne architects group (also responsible for the Pousadas in Viseu and Faro) and David Sinclair. The Pousada da Serra da Estrela is to be adapted out of the sanatorium for the railway employees by Cottinelli Telmo. Eduardo Souto de Moura, winner of the Pritzker Prize in 2011 is the architect. He was also responsible for the conversion of the Convent of Santa Maria do Bouro into the Pousada de Amares.

=== Worldwide ===
In 2005, the first Pousada de Portugal outside of Portugal opened in Brazil, in a historic building and fort built by the Portuguese. Although this is by far the biggest hotel in the chain, in Brazil the term pousada usually refers to a cheaper hotel, more like a bed and breakfast, which may lead to confusion.

Under an internationalization plan, the PPG wants to open Pousadas in all the locations that the Portuguese once ruled: Asia (Goa, Macau and even East Timor), Africa (Cape Verde, Mozambique and even Angola) and new places in Brazil.

== Pousadas hotel chain segmentation ==
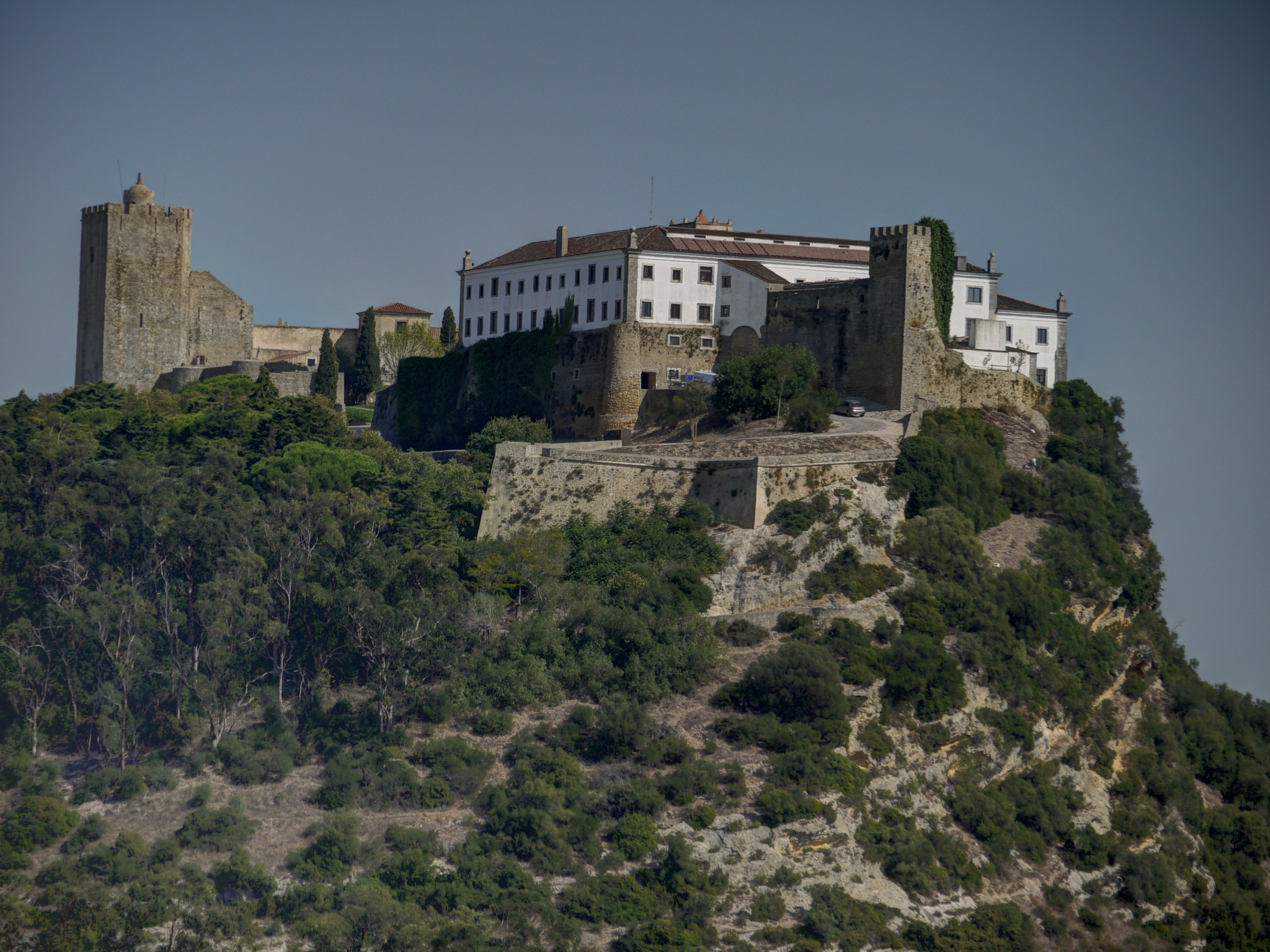
Pousada of Palmela, located in the former castle and headquarters of the Military Order of Saint James of the Sword

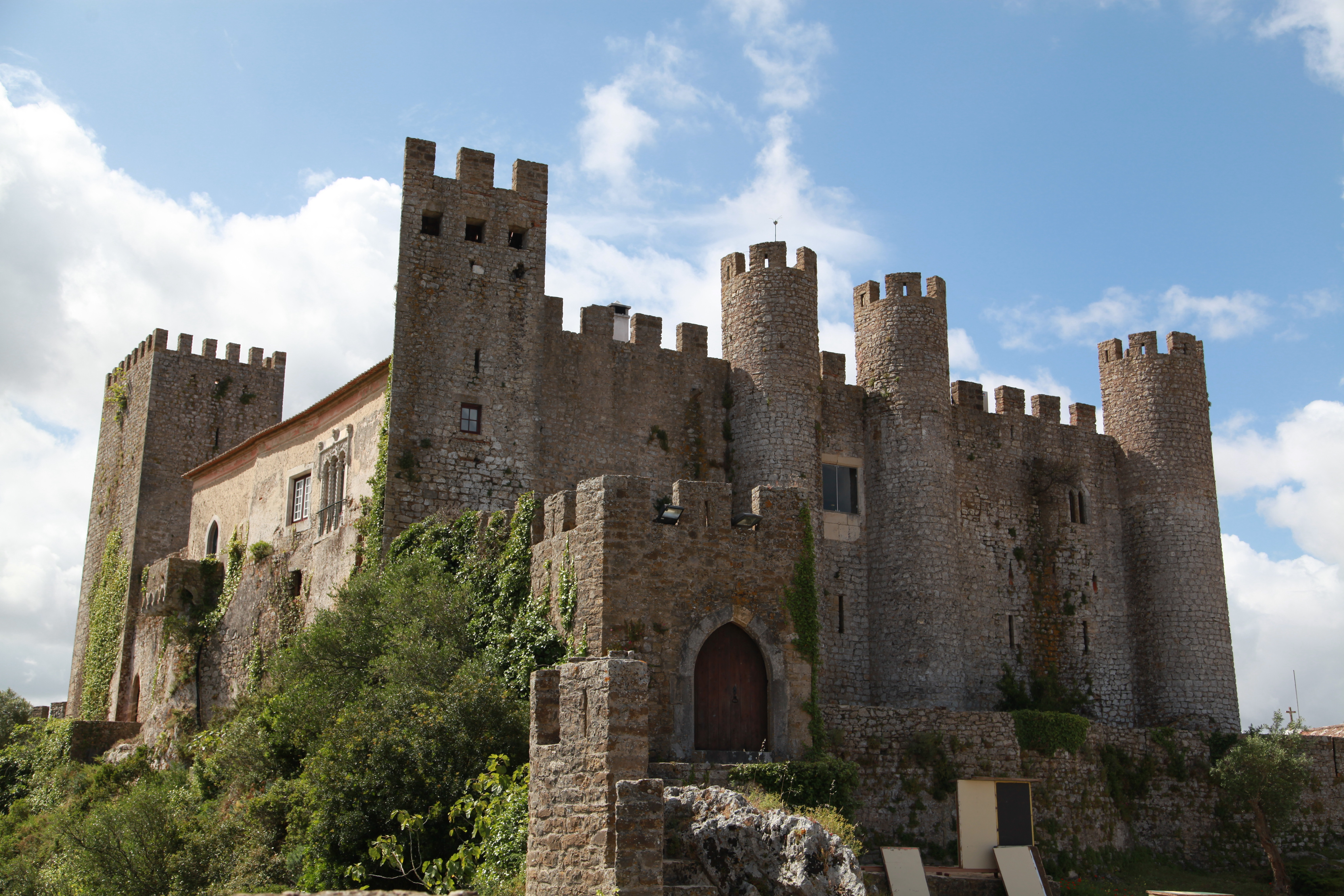
Pousada de Óbidos, installed in the medieval Castle of Óbidos

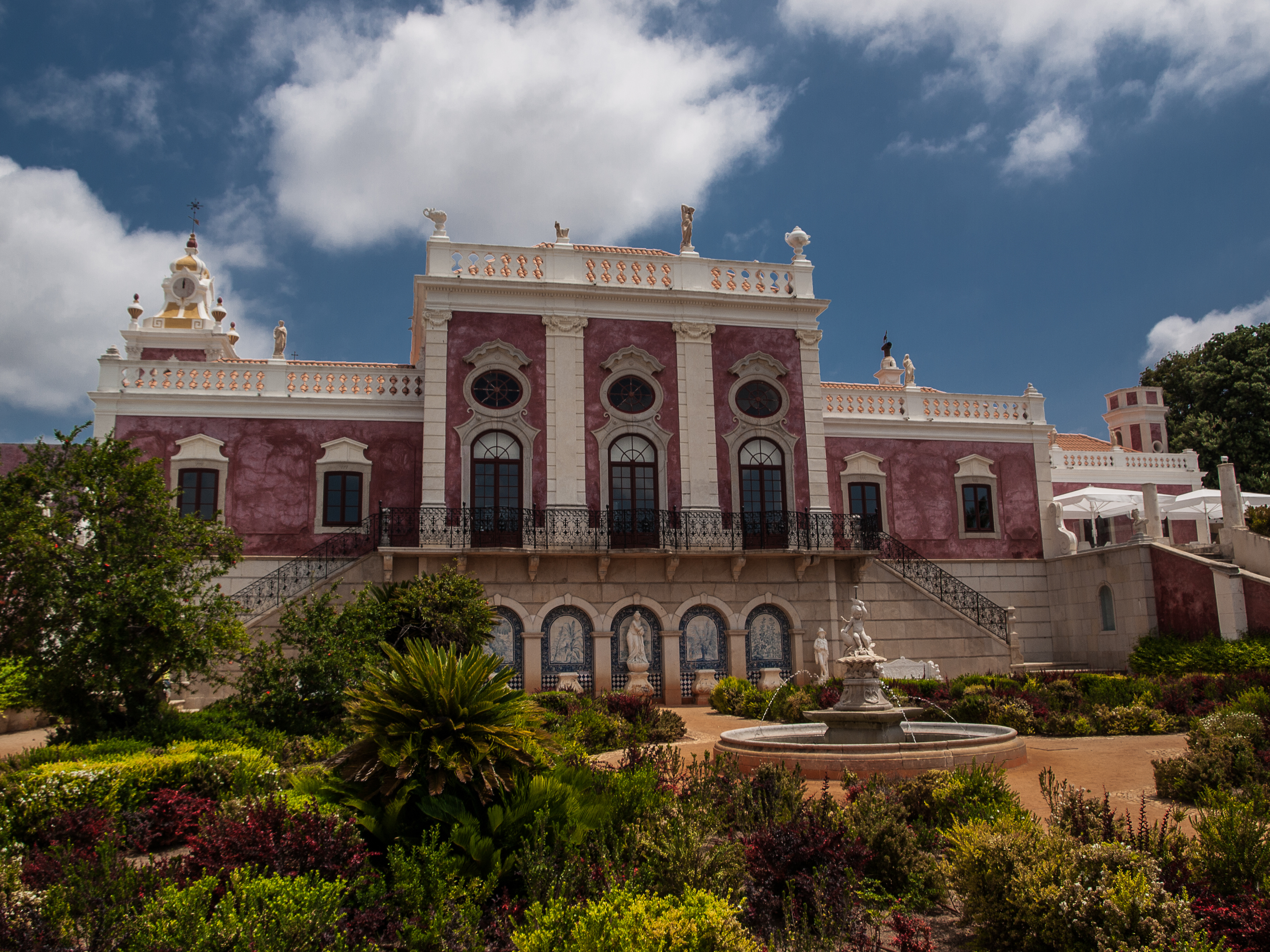
Pousada de Faro-Estói, installed in a romantic palace of the late 19th century

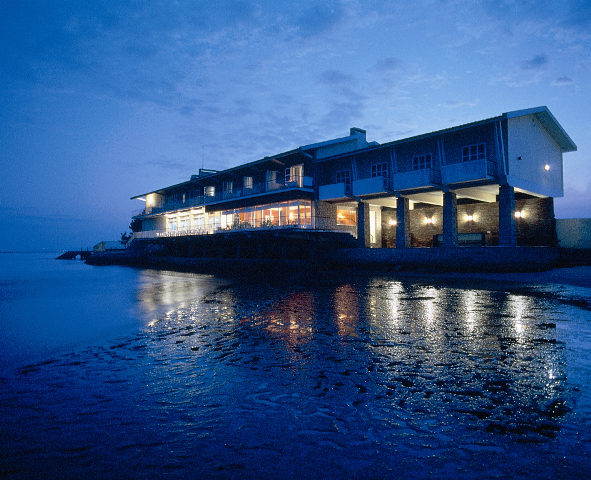
Pousada da Ria, Murtosa, purpose built in the late 1950s

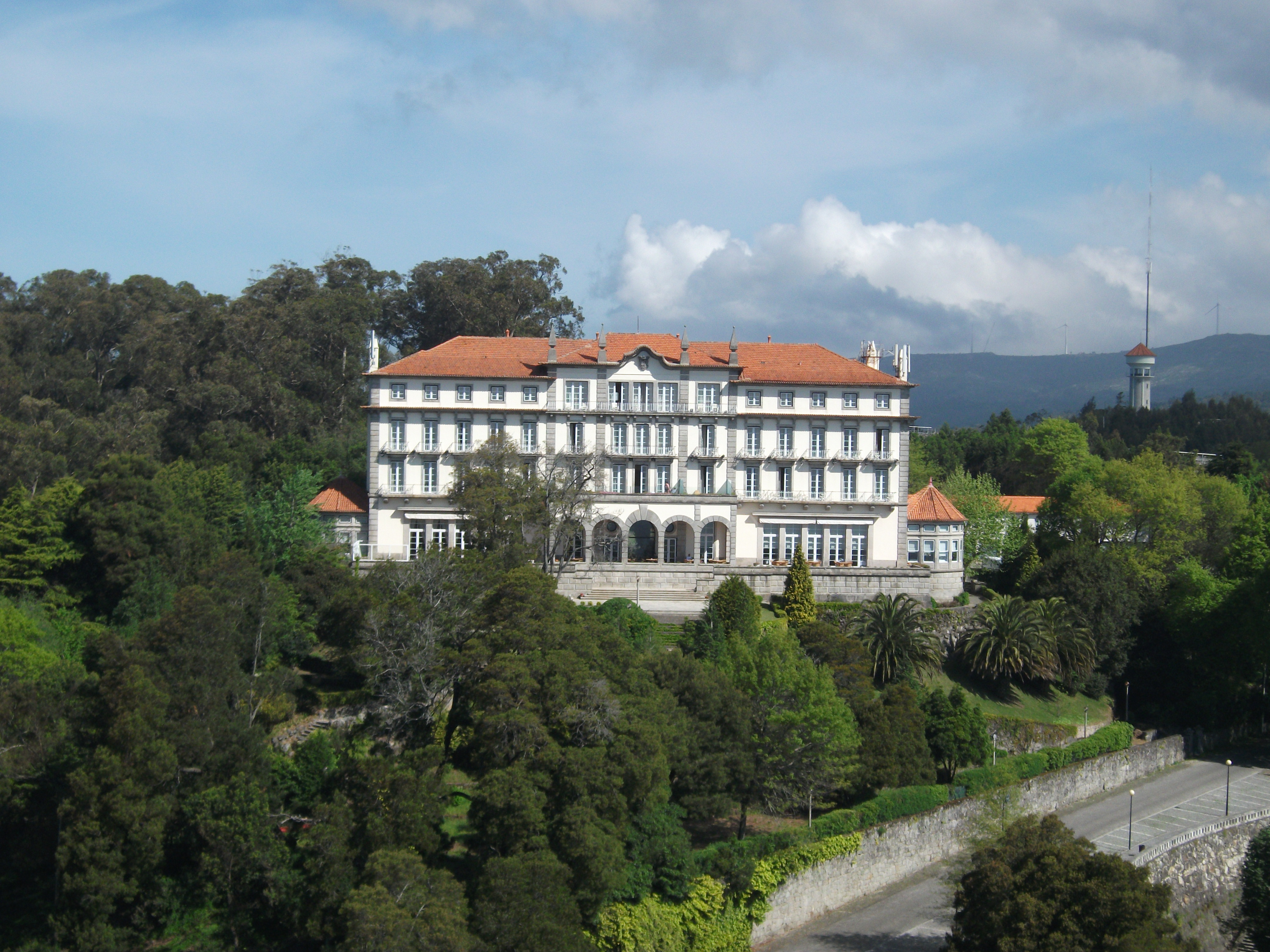
Pousada de Viana do Castelo, occupying an early 20th-century hotel

The pousadas are divided in four main groups, according to their architectural specificity, its surroundings or even its concept:

- Pousadas históricas (historic pousadas), located in well preserved yet unspoiled national monuments, such as convents, monasteries, castles or fortresses;
- Pousadas históricas design (historic design pousadas), also in monuments, castles, convents, fortresses and palaces that were vastly renovated, sporting artistic and contemporary decoration and facilities;
- Pousadas natureza (nature pousadas), in natural countryside locations;
- Pousadas charme (charm pousadas), located in areas of romantic, unique atmosphere.

=== Historic pousadas ===
In historical buildings

- Alvito – Pousada de Alvito Historic Hotel
- Beja – Pousada de Beja Historic Hotel
- Belmonte – Pousada do Convento de Belmonte
- Estremoz – Pousada de Estremoz Historic Hotel
- Évora – Pousada de Évora Historic Hotel
- Guimarães – Pousada de Guimarães - Sta. Marinha Historic Hotel
- Mesão Frio – Pousada do Solar da Rede
- Óbidos – Pousada de Óbidos Historic Hotel
- Ourém – Pousada de Ourém – Fátima Historic Hotel
- Palmela – Pousada de Palmela Historic Hotel
- Porto (Freixo) – Pousada do Porto Palace Hotel
- Queluz / Lisbon – Pousada de Queluz Palace Hotel
- Setúbal – Pousada de Setubal Historic Hotel
- Tavira – Pousada de Tavira Historic Hotel
- Vila Pouca da Beira – Pousada Convento do Desagravo Historic Hotel
- Vila Viçosa – Pousada de Vila Viçosa Historic Hotel

=== Historic design pousadas ===
In historical buildings with modern architectural elements

- Alcácer do Sal – Pousada de Alcácer do Sal Historic Hotel
- Amares/Gerês – Pousada de Amares Historic Hotel
- Angra do Heroísmo, Azores – Pousada de Angra do Heroísmo Historic Hotel
- Arraiolos – Pousada de Arraiolos Historic Hotel
- Covilhã – Pousada da Serra da Estrela
- Crato – Pousada do Crato Historic Hotel
- Faro (Estoi) – Pousada de Faro Palace Hotel

=== Nature pousadas ===
In calm and relaxing places, with characteristics for eco-tourism

- Caniçada/Gerês – Pousada do Gerês – Caniçada Charming Hotel
- Manteigas – Pousada de Manteigas Charming Hotel
- Marão – Pousada de São Gonçalo
- Ria de Aveiro – Pousada da Ria de Aveiro Charming Hotel
- Sagres – Pousada de Sagres Charming Hotel

=== Charm pousadas ===
In charismatic buildings or places

- Alijó – Pousada de Alijó Charming Hotel
- Braga – Pousada de Braga Charming Hotel
- Bragança – Pousada de Bragança Charming Hotel
- Condeixa-a-Nova – Pousada de Condeixa-a-Nova Charming Hotel
- Elvas – Pousada de Elvas Charming Hotel (first Pousada of the network)
- Guimarães – Pousada de Guimarães – N. Sra. Oliveira Charming Hotel
- Horta, Azores – Pousada da Horta Historic Hotel
- Marvão – Pousada de Marvão Charming Hotel
- Valença do Minho – Pousada de Valença Charming Hotel
- Viana do Castelo – Pousada de Viana do Castelo Charming Hotel
- Viseu – Pousada de Viseu Charming Spa Hotel
