= Álvaro Gil Cabral =

Portuguese politician

- Senhor of Azurara and Belmonte
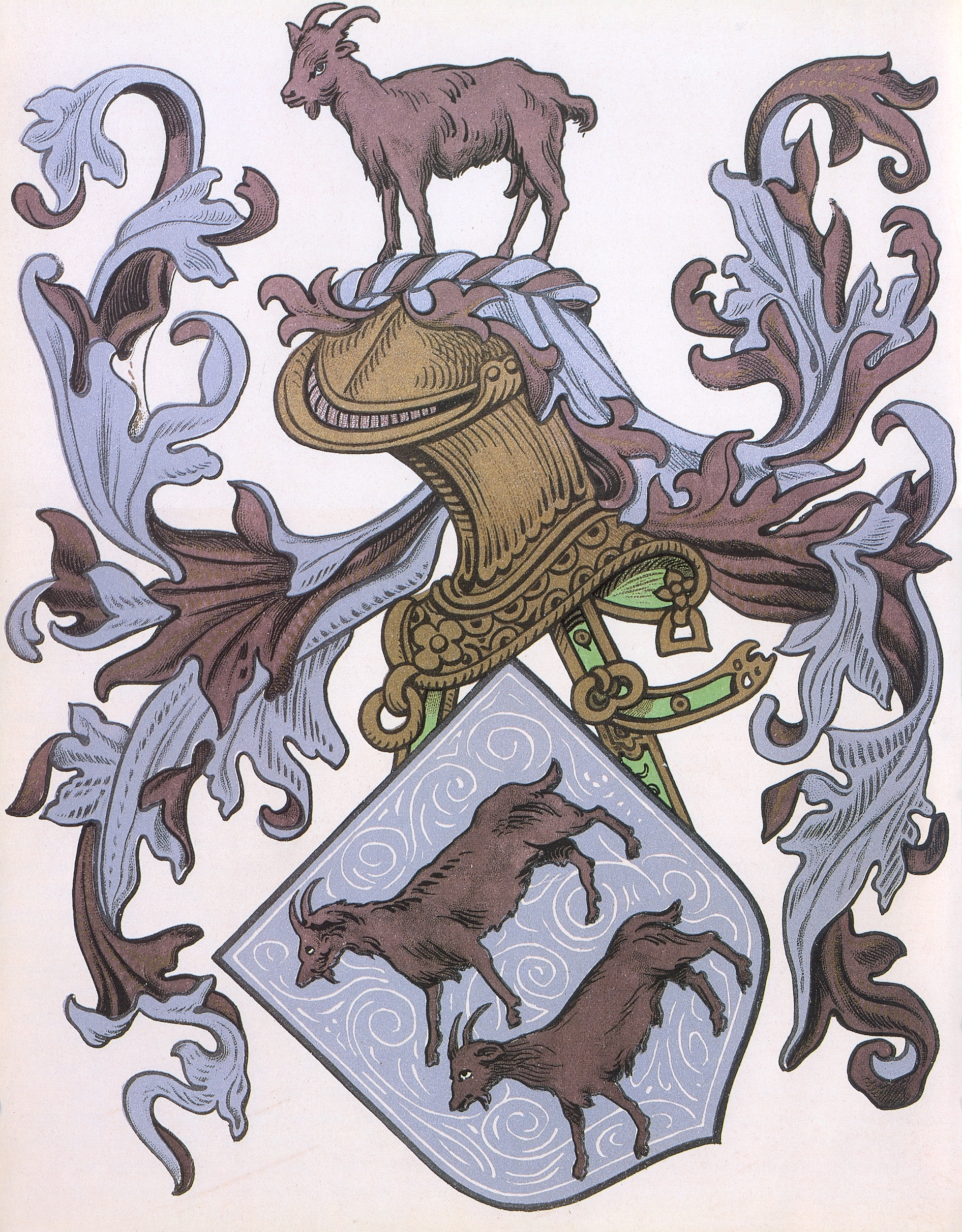
- Coat of Arms belonging to Cabral lineage
- Born: 14th century Kingdom of Portugal
- Died: 14th century Coimbra, Portugal
- Noble family: Cabraes
- Occupation: Politician

Álvaro Gil Cabral (c.1335-?) was a Portuguese nobleman, Lord of Belmonte, and Azurara. He served as Alcaide of Guarda, Portugal between 1383 and 1399.

== Biography ==
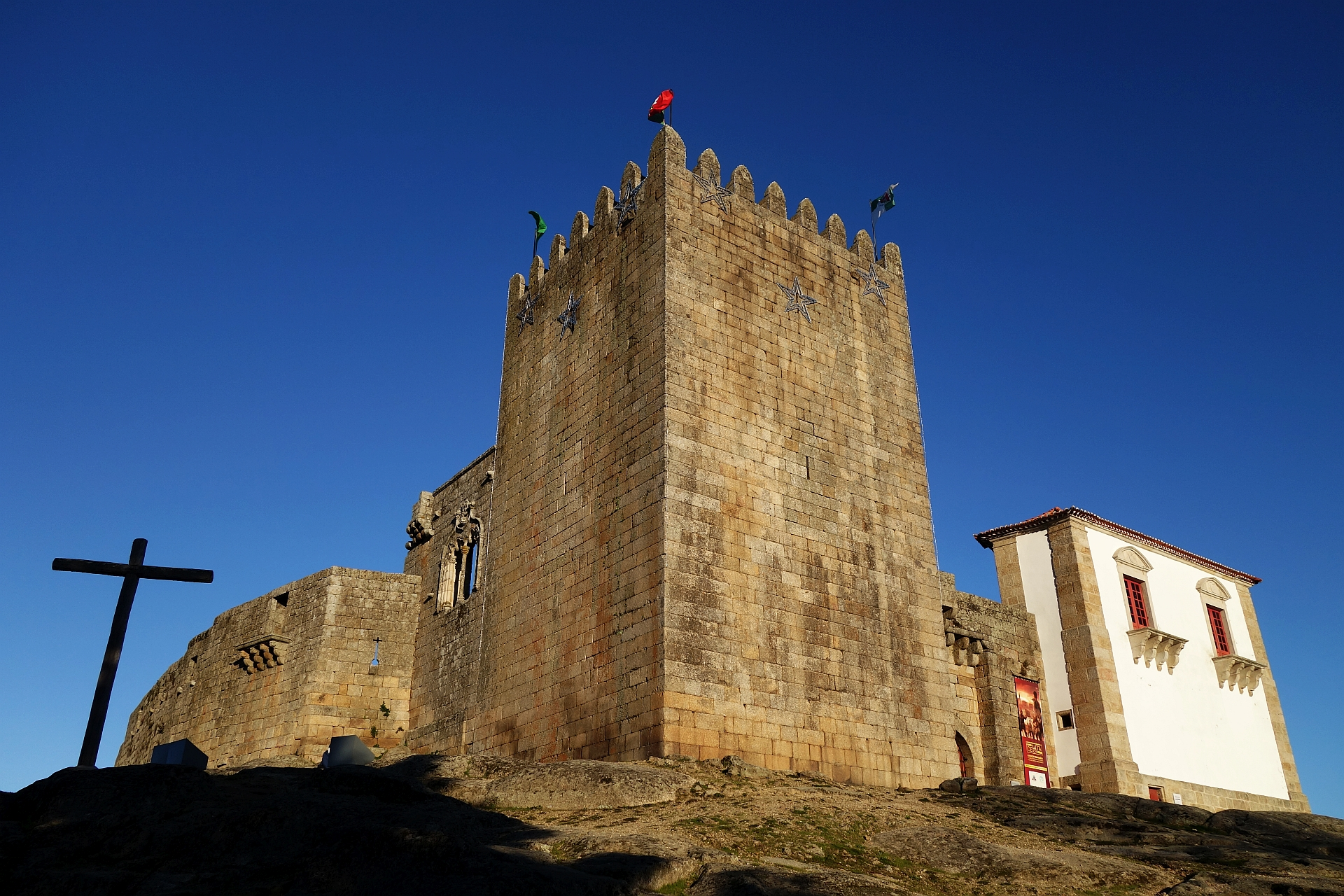
Castle of Belmonte (Belmonte)

Álvaro was born in the Iberian Peninsula, son of Gil Cabral, a nobleman who was bishop of Guarda. He was married to Catarina Anes de Loureiro, daughter of João Anes Loureiro and Catarina Dias de Figueiredo, a noble lady, descendant of Rui Vasques Pereira.

Cabral was related to the discoverer of the Azores, he was the maternal grandfather of Gonçalo Velho Cabral. And he was the paternal great-grandfather of the discoverer of Brazil, Pedro Álvares Cabral.

Álvaro Gil Cabral participated actively in Portuguese politics, being vassal of Ferdinand I and John I. He took part in the Battle of Aljubarrota, against the troops of John I of Castile.
