= Abreu Carga =

Abreu - Carga e Trânsitos, Lda.
- Company type: Privately held company
- Industry: Transportation
- Founded: 1994
- Headquarters: Lisbon, Portugal
- Products: Air, land and ocean freight services
- Parent: Viagens Abreu
- Website: www.abreulogistics.com

Abreu - Carga e Trânsitos, Lda., often simply abbreviated to Abreu Carga or, more recently, Abreu Logistics, is one of the main freight forwarders' companies in Portugal, and operates air, land and ocean freight services from, to and within Portugal.

Established in Porto in 1994, the current headquarters are located in the suburb of Santa Iria de Azoia in a spacious and modern office building and warehouse.

Other warehouses and offices of Abreu Logistics are located in the surroundings and airports of Lisbon, Porto, Funchal (Madeira), Ponta Delgada (Azores), Angra do Heroísmo (Azores) and Horta (Azores). New and modern facilities opened in early 2000s in Lisbon and Porto with a total of 30.000 m^{2} (11.000 m^{2} covered area).

Abreu Carga is owned by Viagens Abreu, the leading leisure travel agency in Portugal since 1840.
