= Gonçalo Byrne =

Portuguese architect

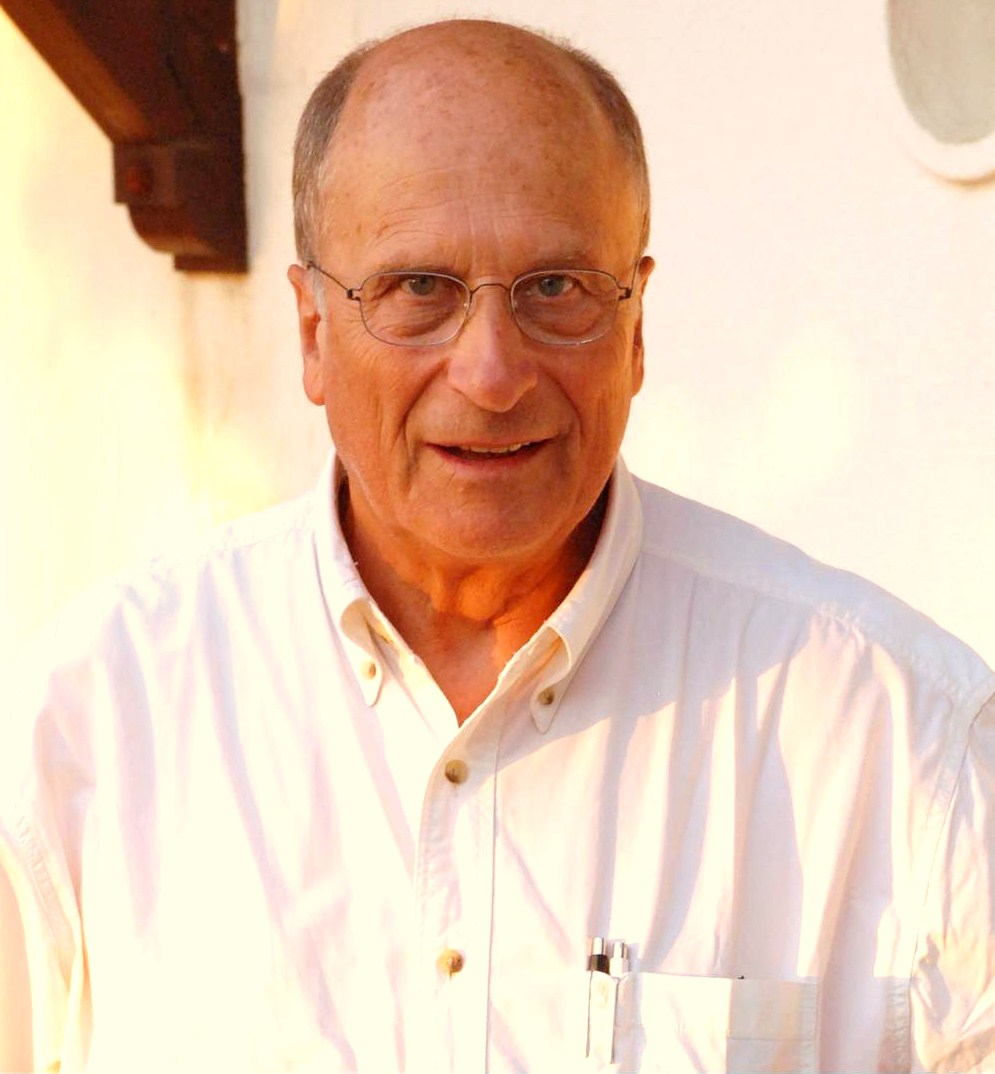
Gonçalo Byrne.

Gonçalo Byrne, GCIH (born 17 January 1941 in Alcobaça) is a Portuguese architect.

Byrne is responsible for a vast accomplishment of architectural work, and has been awarded with many national and international prizes.

In 2005 he was awarded the title of Doctor Honoris Causa from the Lisbon Faculty of Architecture, Technical University of Lisbon, and was awarded the Grand Cross of the Order of Santiago da Espada by the President of the Portuguese Republic. Included in his diversified body of work, in terms of scale, theme and programme, the more relevant examples are the recent interventions in the Monastery of Alcobaça and its surrounding areas, the building for the Headquarters of the Government of the Province of Flemish Brabant in Leuven, Belgium, the Marine Traffic Control Tower for the Port of Lisbon Authority, the "Império" Quarter in the Chiado area of Lisbon, the Faro Theatre in the Algarve, and the National Museum Machado de Castro, in Coimbra, this latter project currently under construction.

Within the area of urban planning he carried out the Detailed Plans for the surrounding areas of the Ajuda National Palace, in Lisbon, for the Higher City University, in Coimbra, for the "Cava do Viriato" within the scope of the Polis Programme, in Viseu, as well as the Plan for the Town of Trancoso, this within the scope of the Programme for the Historical Villages of Portugal. He is currently developing relevant projects such as the Estoi Inn & Charm Hotel, in the Algarve, the Viseu Inn, the Estoril – Sol Building Complex, the "Jade" Building Complex in Lisbon, the New Central Laboratory for EPAL (Lisbon Water Distribution Company) and several single family villas in the Bom Sucesso Resort in Óbidos.

== Works ==
- 1974 - House in Chelas, Lisbon
- 1975 - Casal das Figuieras housing complex (Saal Operation), Setúbal
- 1977/90 Exhibition and sports centre, Braga
- 1984 - New bank, Vidiguiera
- 1992 - New bank, Arraiolos
- 1983 - Housing for the Coociclo cooperative in Restelo, Lisbon
- 1984 - Sa da Costa House in Alvalade, Lisbon
- 1989 - Cesar Ferreira House, Alcanema
- 1986 - Buildings on Piazza Luis de Camões, Vila do Conde
- 1988 - Somincor House, Castro Verde

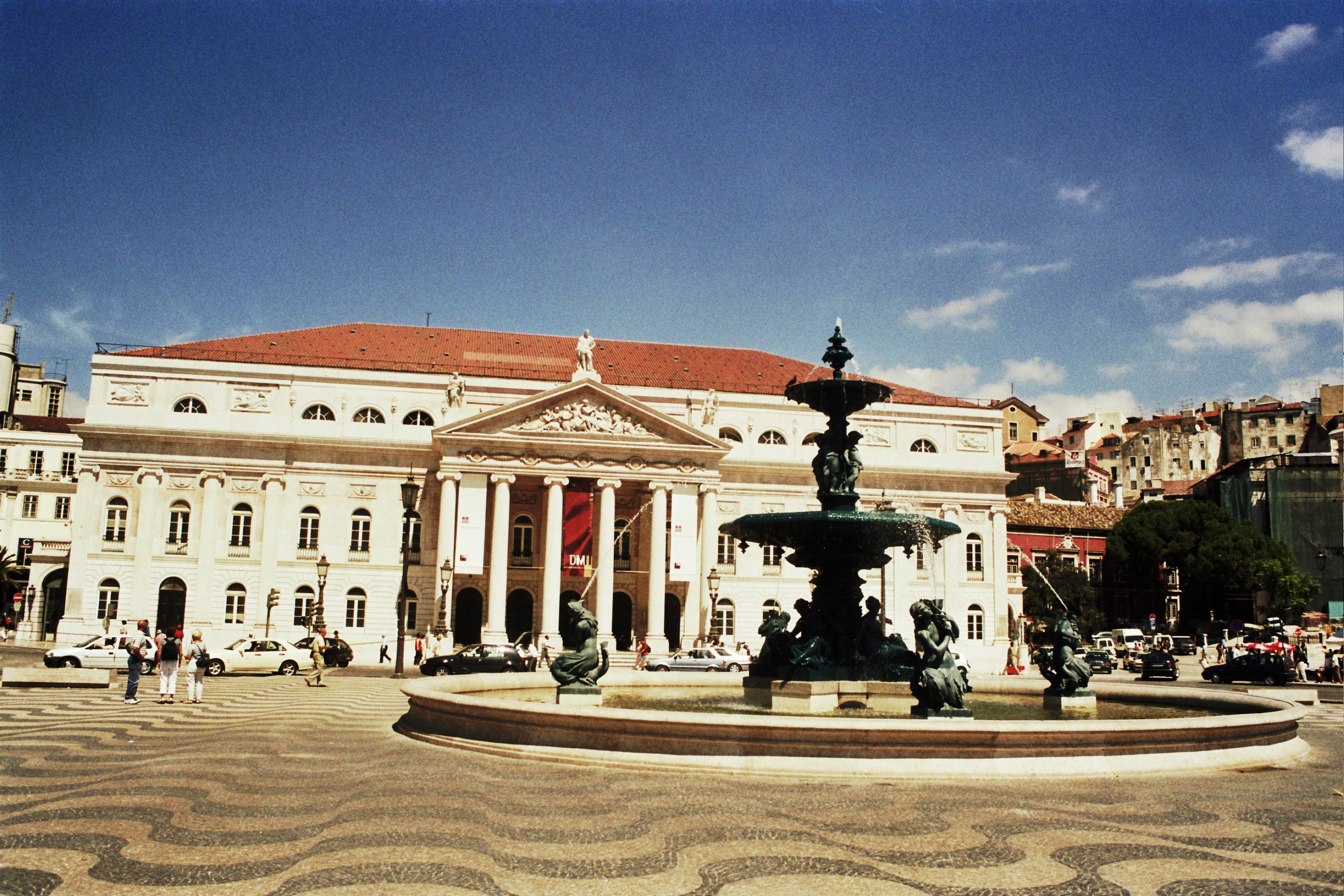
Dona Maria II theatre, Lisbon

- 1991 - Renovation of the Dona Maria II theatre, Lisbon
- 1991 - Tourist complex, centre for oceanographic research and nautical club at Cais do Carvao, Funchal, Madeira
- 1991 - Enlargement of the Institute of Social and Political Sciences, Technical University of Lisbon, Lisbon
- 1991 - Uninova centre for environmental research, Almada
- 1991 - Tomasio House, Setúbal
- 1991 - Completion of the Ajuda National Palace, Lisbon
- 1992 - Chancellor's office on the Aveiro University campus, Aveiro
- 1992 - Marina of Lagos
- 1992 - Institute of Economics and Management of Lisbon - ISEG of Technical University of Lisbon, Lisbon
- 1993 - Department of Mathematics and teaching facilities for the Faculty of Science and Technology, Lisbon
- 1993 - Chemistry and Physics Department of the Faculty of Sciences, University of Lisbon, Lisbon
- 1993 - Housing, Hoeilaart, Belgium
- 1993 - Centre for chemical and biological technology, Oeiras
- 1994 - Renovation of a block in the Chiado, Lisbon
- 1995 - Experimental research laboratory for the Institute of Tropical Medicine, Lisbon
- 1995 - Sports complex, Vila Do Conde
- 1996 - Faculty of Computer Studies and Electronics at Polo II of University of Coimbra
- 1997 - Parish buildings for the church in the Chelas valley, Lisbon

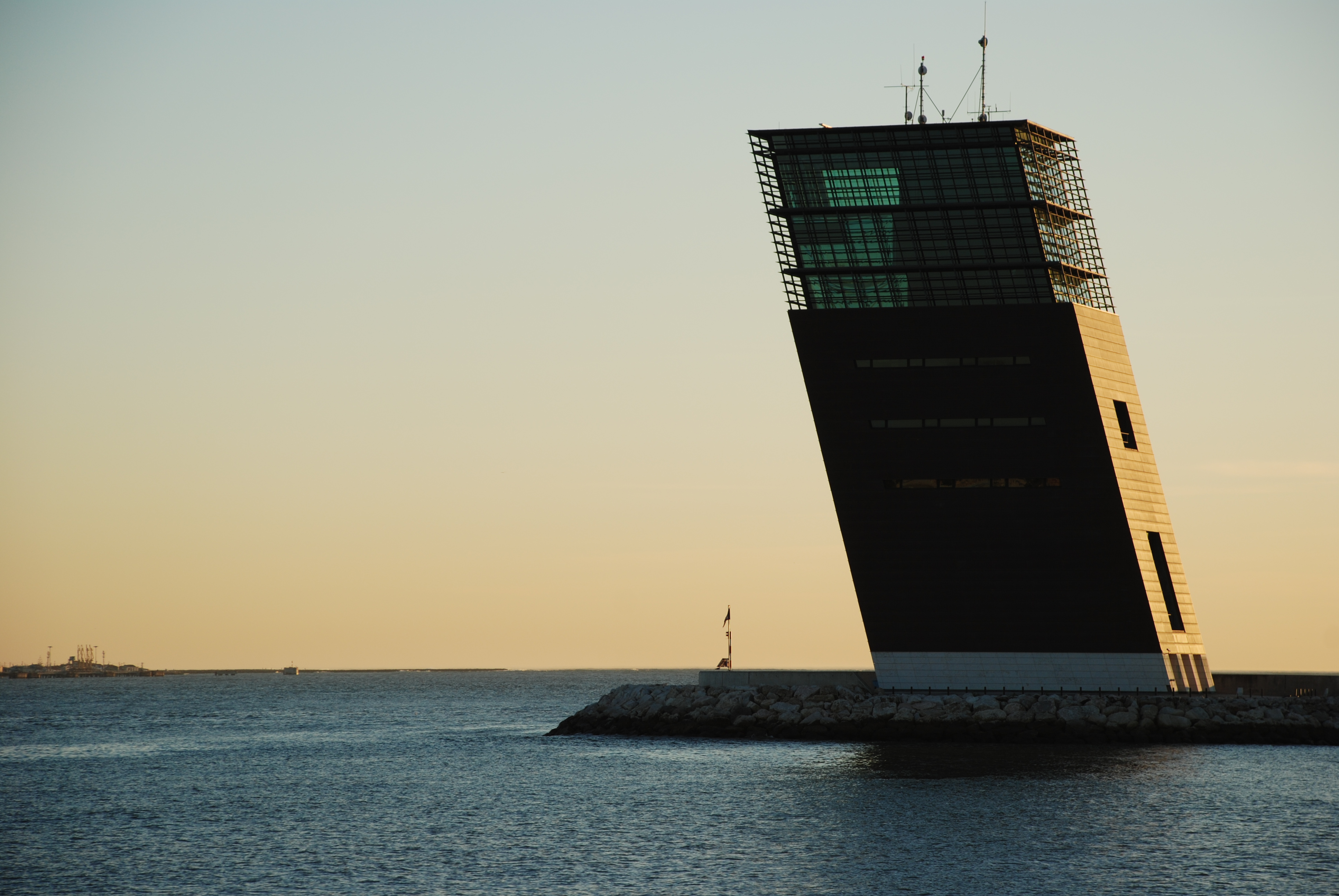
Maritime traffic coordination and control centre in Lisbon, work of Gonçalo Byrne

- 1997 - VTS Tower - Maritime traffic coordination and control centre, Lisbon
- 1998 - Headquarters of the Government of the Province of Flemish Brabant, Leuven, Belgium
- 1999 - Headquarters of Banco Mais Bank, Lisbon

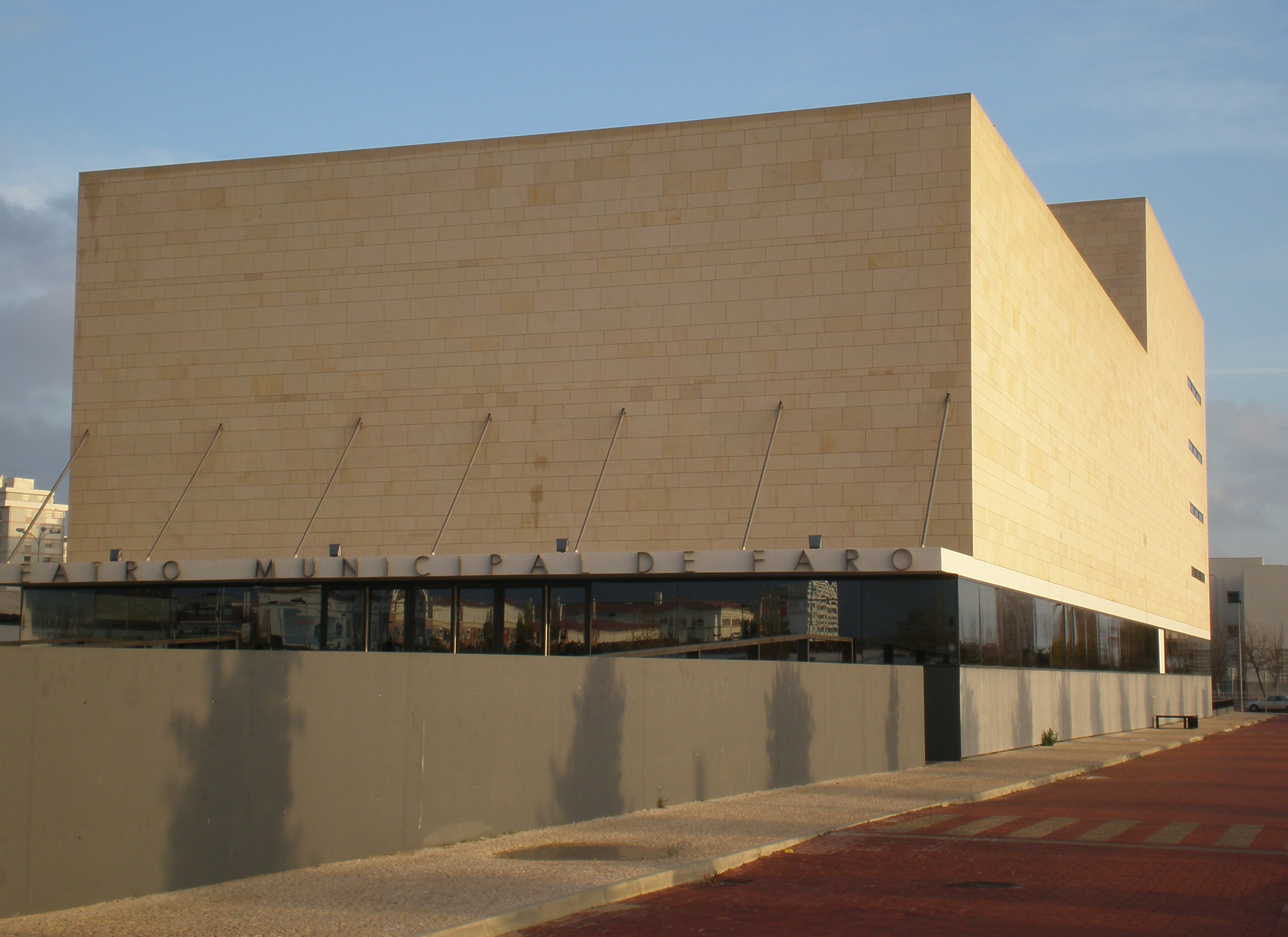
Teatro das Figuras (Faro, Portugal), work of Gonçalo Byrne (2002-05)

- 2002 - Faro Theatre (Teatro das Figuras), Algarve, Portugal
- 2002/? Forlanini park, Milan, Italy
- 2003/? Casa nel parco, Jesolo, Italy
- 2004/? Single family villas in the Bom Sucesso Resort, Obidos
- 2004 - Extension and Spa of Quinta das Lagrimas Hotel, Coimbra
- 2005 - Interventions in the Monastery of Alcobaça and its surrounding areas
- 2008 - Interventions in the National Museum Machado de Castro, Coimbra
- 2008 - Palace of Estoi to Pousadas de Portugal - Inn & Charm Hotel, Algarve
- 2008 - Viseu old hospital to Pousadas de Portugal - Inn & Charm Hotel, Viseu

== Awards ==
- 1988 - National Architecture Prize, promoted by the order of Portuguese architects and the Ministry of Culture
- 1988 - A.I.C.A.-S.E.C. critic's prize
- 1993 - Prémio Nacional de Arquitectura
- 1995 - Cross of Grand Officer of the Order of Infante D. Henrique by the President of the Portuguese Republic
- 2000 - Gold Medal of the Academie d'Architecture de France
- 2000 - Lisbon Valmor Prize
- 2002 - International TECU Architecture Award
- 2005 - Doctor Honoris Causa from the Lisbon Faculty of Architecture, Technical University
- 2006 - Grand Cross of the Order of St. James of the Sword (Ordem Santiago da Espada) by the President of the Portuguese Republic
