= Cândido Mota (radio announcer) =

Portuguese actor (1943–2026)

Cândido Soares Pinto da Mota (28 September 1943 – 3 May 2026) was a Portuguese radio broadcaster, television host and actor, known for his deep, resonant voice. He became famous for hosting the program Em Órbita and gained widespread popularity with the radio show O Passageiro da Noite (The Night Passenger) and his subsequent collaborations with Herman José.

== Life and career ==
Mota was the son of the Fado singer Maria Albertina. His father passed away when Mota was 14 years old. He began working in radio at the age of 17 at Rádio Clube Português. It was at RDP - Rádio Comercial that he achieved his greatest success, with programs such as Em Órbita, O Passageiro da Noite, Fonografias, and Dançatlântico. O Passageiro da Noite was one of the first interactive broadcasts in Portuguese radio history. It aired from midnight for one hour, and listeners could call the studio to speak live on any topic of their choice. Cândido Mota intervened very little, preferring to give a voice to the callers. The program left a significant mark on the history of radio in Portugal, and its format was subsequently imitated numerous times.

He later collaborated with Herman José. He participated as a voice-over, engaging in dialogue with the comedian during the presentation of television game shows A Roda da Sorte (The Wheel of Fortune) and Com a Verdade M' Enganas, both of which aired on RTP during the 1990s.

From then on, Cândido Mota frequently accompanied Herman José on his television programs on both RTP and SIC, occasionally participating in various sketches.

Mota was a member of the Portuguese Communist Party and served as the host voice for the "Palco 25 de Abril" (April 25th Stage) at the Avante! Festival, as well as a supporter of the Unitary Democratic Coalition (CDU).

He was the father of Teresa Mota, a journalist for TSF, and Maria João Mota. He had three grandchildren.

Cândido Mota died on 3 May 2026, at the age of 82.
