= Viagens Abreu =

Portuguese travel agency

Agência Abreu
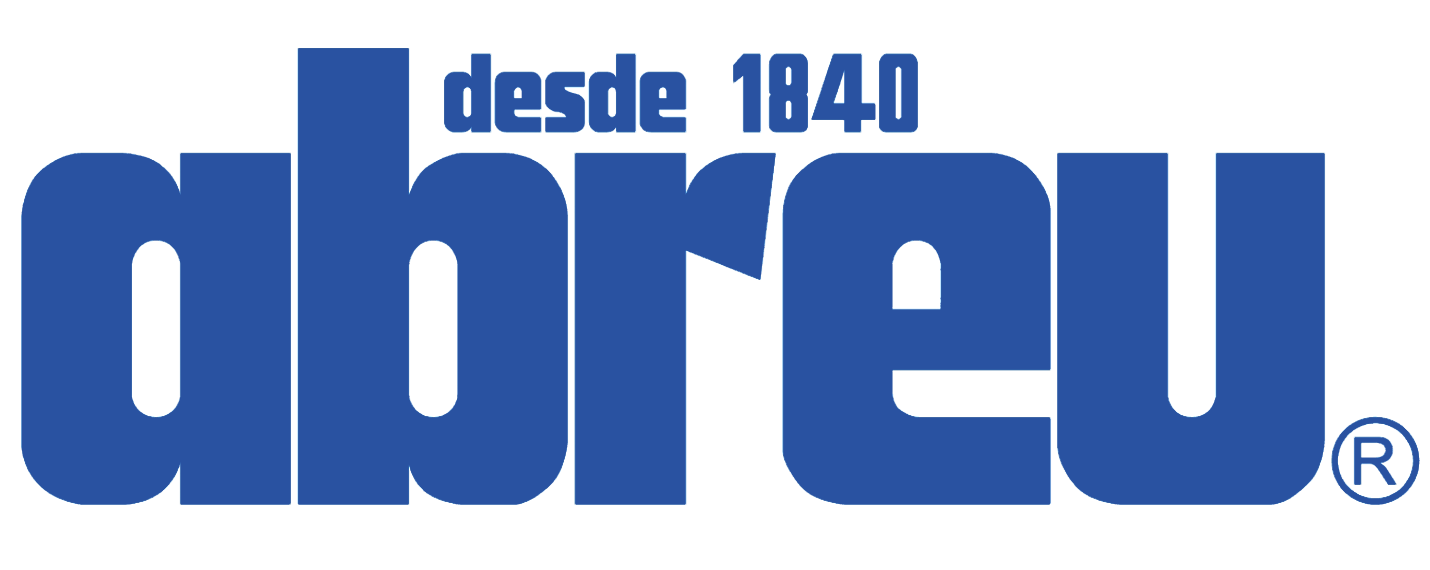
- Type: Privately held company
- Industry: Travel agency
- Founded: 1840
- Headquarters: Porto, Portugal
- Products: Leisure, Corporate, DMC, Congresses, Groups and Incentives
- Website: www.abreu.pt

Agência Abreu is a travel agency in Portugal. The current headquarters are in Porto, with the main office in Linda–a–Velha, a suburb of Lisbon, in a spacious office building. Abreu has offices throughout Portugal, with over 120 retail locations in the mainland, and the islands of Madeira and the Azores.

== History ==
The Abreu Agency was established in Porto in 1840 by Bernardo Abreu. At the time, emigration from northern Portugal and Galicia to Brazil and Venezuela was significant, and Abreu, a noted businessman in Porto, opened his agency to offer passport and visa services, as well as sales of train tickets to Lisbon and ship passages to and from South America.

Thus the oldest travel agency in the world was created from the close ties Portugal and Brazil still enjoy. After World War II, as the growth of commercial aviation shortened the distances between continents and international tourism expanded, Abreu developed into its current organization.

Five generations later, the company is still owned by the same family and their direct descendants.

== Viagens Abreu today ==
Agência Abreu offers an integrated service, with specialized departments covering all the major areas of the business (B2C and B2B, inbound and outbound): Leisure Travel, Corporate Travel, Youth Travel, Senior Travel, Tour Operation, Destination Management, congresses, groups and incentives, fairs, and exhibitions.

A steady growth in the Portuguese market lead to the expansion of the company to international locations, with the opening of companies in Brazil, Spain, England, and the United States.

The company owns one of the main tour operator companies in Portugal, Club 1840, which operates Long Haul and Medium Haul charter operations, Scheduled flights operations, Escorted Tours in Europe, and all around the world, Cruises, Theme Parks, Winter holidays, etc.

Agência Abreu also owns Abreu Carga, a cargo company that operates air, land, and ocean freight from, to, and within Portugal.

Agência Abreu has a stake in Pousadas de Portugal.
