= Belmonte, Portugal =

Belmonte
- Municipality
- Town of Belmonte
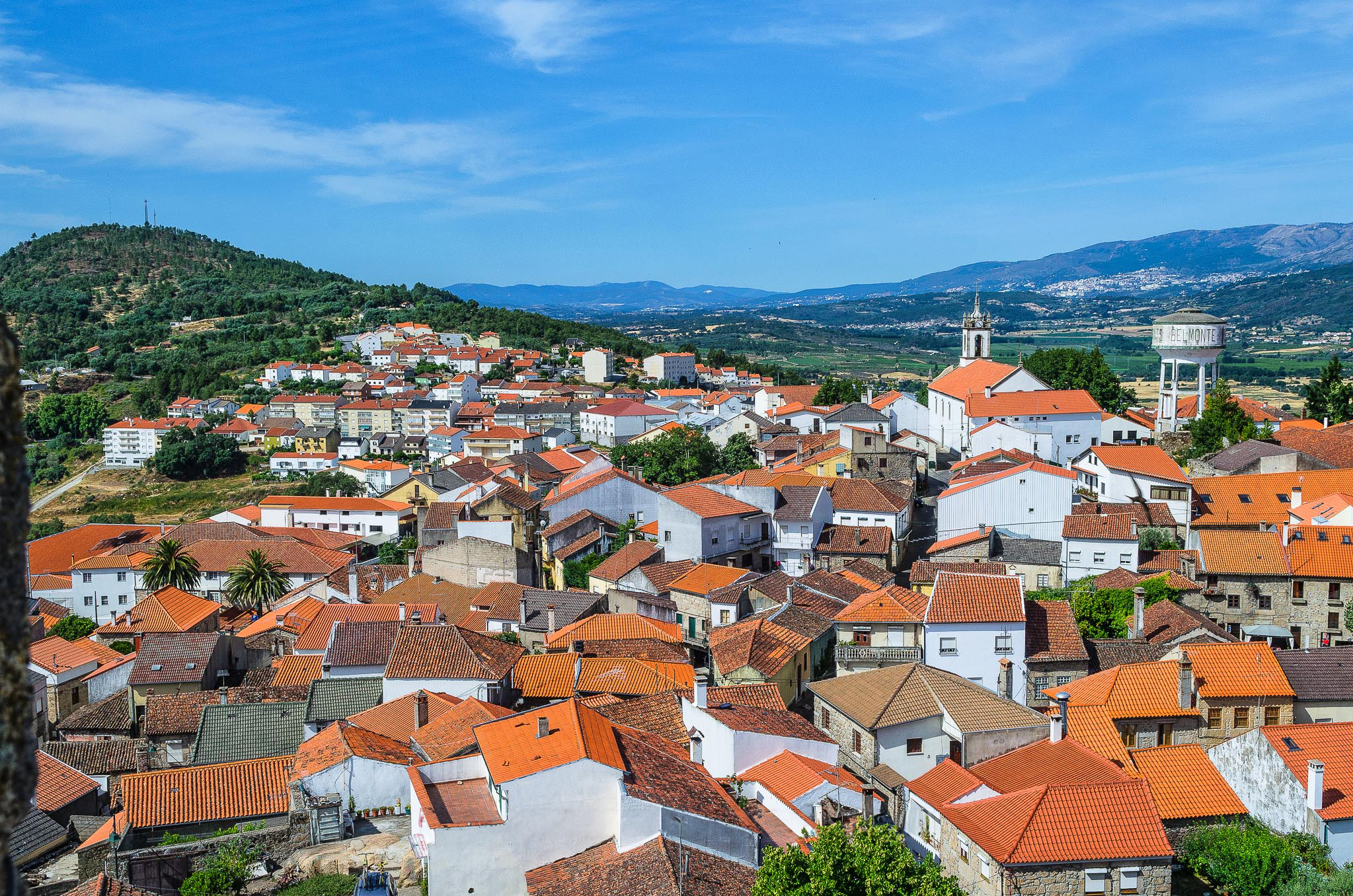
- View of Belmonte

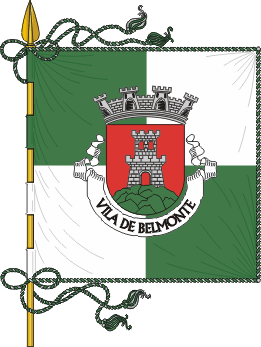
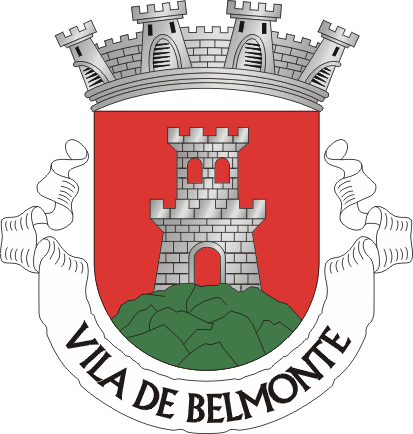
- Flag Coat of arms
- Interactive map of Belmonte
- Location in Portugal
- Coordinates: 40°21′N 7°21′W
- Country: Portugal
- Region: Centro
- Intermunic. comm.: Beiras e Serra da Estrela
- District: Castelo Branco

Area
  - Total: 118.76 km^{2} (45.85 sq mi)

Population (2021)
  - Total: 6,205
  - Density: 52.25/km^{2} (135.3/sq mi)
- Time zone: UTC+00:00 (WET)
  - Summer (DST): UTC+01:00 (WEST)
- Website: https://www.cm-belmonte.pt

Belmonte (Portuguese pronunciation: [ˌbɛlˈmõtɨ]), officially Town of Belmonte (Portuguese: Vila de Belmonte), is a town and municipality in the district of Castelo Branco, Portugal. The municipality's population in 2021 was 6,205, in an area of 118.76 square kilometres (45.85 mi^{2}).

Belmonte is distinguished by its Jewish community, which dates back to at least the 13th century. This community, numbering about 300 in 2008, preserved its faith through crypto-Judaism, maintaining Jewish traditions in secret despite the pressures of the Inquisition and forced conversions. Open practice was re-established with the founding of a synagogue in 1996. The Belmonte Jewish Museum, opened in 2005, chronicles this history.

== History ==
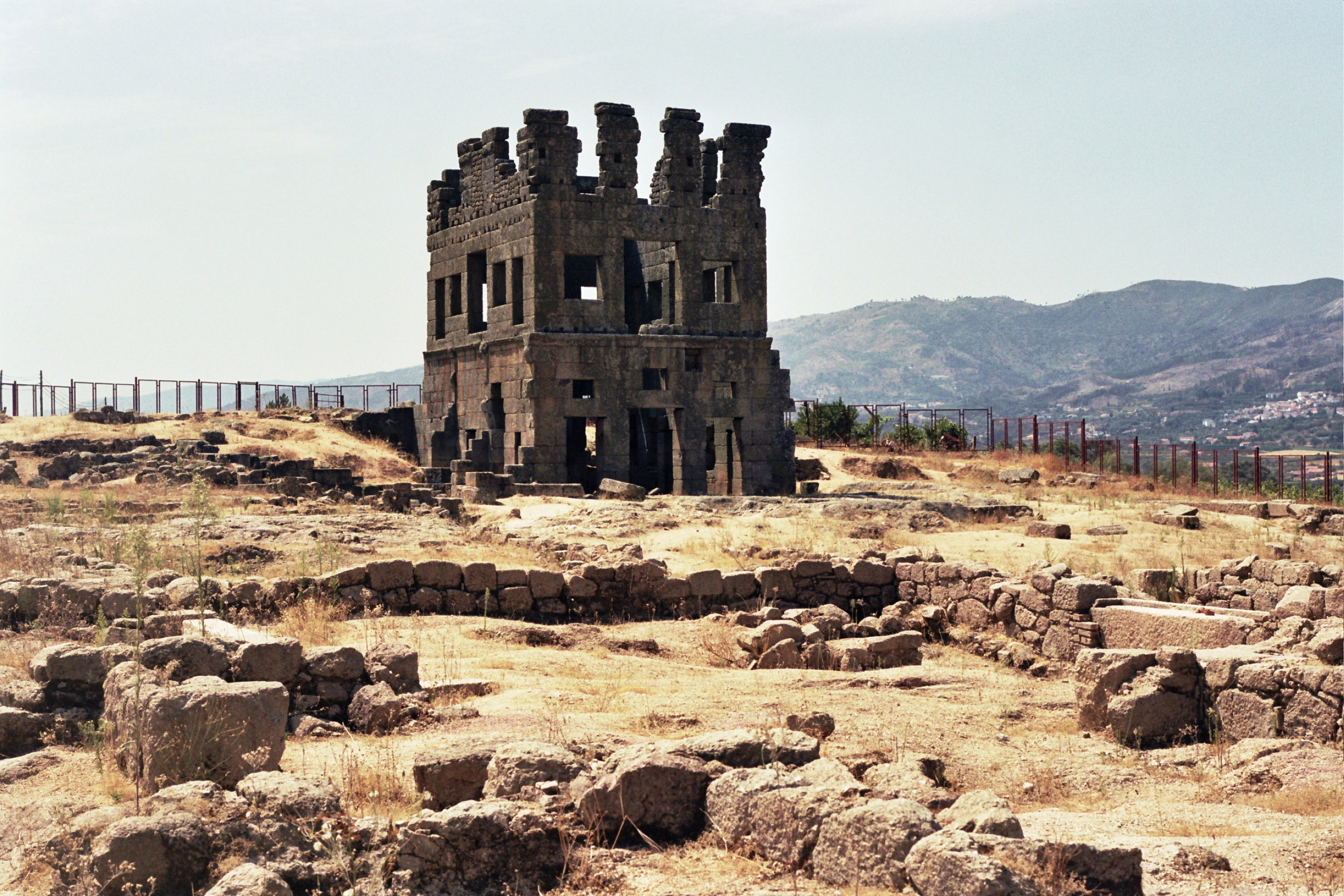
Centum Cellas, originally a Roman Villa and later used as a military Outpost

Archaeological findings indicate that Belmonte's lands have been occupied since prehistoric times, with notable megalithic sites in the parishes of Inguias and Caria dating back approximately 6,000 years. Ancient fortified settlements (castros) existed in the mountains around Belmonte, such as the Castro of Chandeirinha in the mountain range of Senhora da Esperança.

During the Roman era, Belmonte's mineral and agricultural wealth attracted settlers. They established roads to Belmonte and constructed sites like Quinta da Fornea in the parish of Belmonte and the monumental Centum Cellas in Colmeal da Torre.

Belmonte was established as a municipality in 1199, when it received its first charter (foral) from King Sancho I and the Bishop of Coimbra. This charter aimed to populate the region, establishing Belmonte under Portuguese political control.

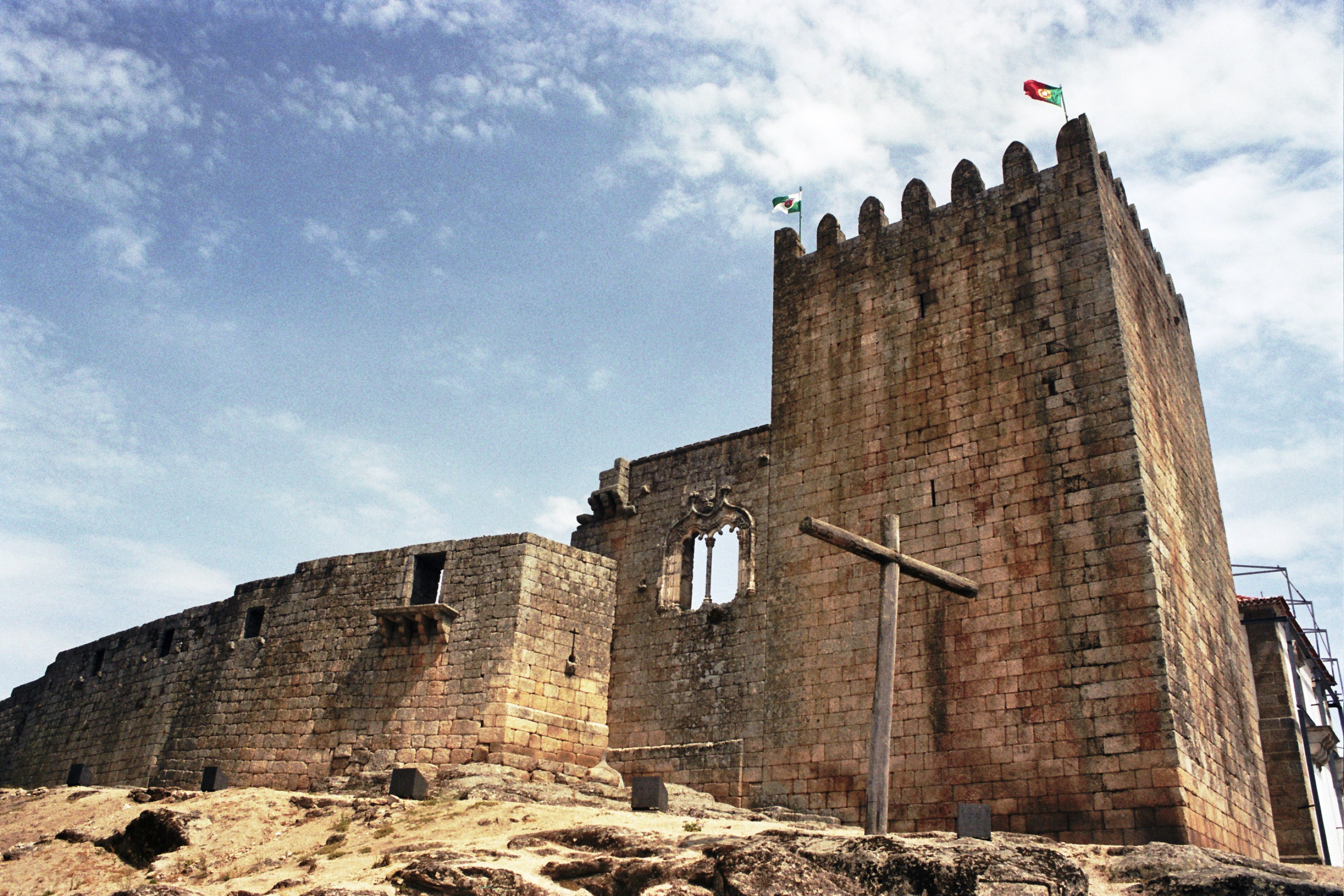
Castle of Belmonte, Portugal.

Toward the end of the 12th century, the Belmonte Castle was built on Monte da Esperança, in the town of Belmonte. Together with the castles of Sortelha and Vila do Touro, Belmonte Castle formed part of the defensive line along Alto Côa, leveraging the natural barriers of the Serra da Estrela and Zêzere Valley to defend against invasions from León and Castile.

By the 13th century, Belmonte had developed into a thriving town with a significant population of both Christians and Jews, as reflected in the presence of two churches, Santiago and Santa Maria, and a synagogue. The Jewish community likely lived in the area now known as Bairro de Marrocos and it prospered through trade. In 1492, Spain's expulsion of Jews may have contributed to a Jewish population growth. However, in 1496, King Manuel I decreed the forced conversion of Jews in Portugal, which led to the formation of a crypto-Jewish community in Belmonte.

The Cabral family held a central and influential role in the history of Belmonte, starting in the 13th century, when King Afonso III appointed Aires Pires Cabral to oversee the military administration of Belmonte. Around 1240, Maria Odil Cabral and Gil Cabral sponsored the construction of the Church of Santiago. Following the disruptions of the Fernandine Wars and the 1383–1385 interregnum, which left Belmonte's castle in a state of disrepair, King João I granted control of the castle to Álvaro Gil Cabral in 1397, a position later passed to his son, Luís Álvares Cabral.

In 1466, King Afonso V gave the hereditary title of alcaide-mor (chief mayor) to Fernão Cabral, including not only the castle but also all rents, rights, and privileges tied to the town. Fernão Cabral transformed the castle into a fortified manor, where his son, Pedro Álvares Cabral, spent his early years. The Cabral family's legacy continued with the creation of a family pantheon adjacent to the Church of Santiago, which was under construction by 1483 and later renovated by Francisco Cabral in 1630.

In 1527, Belmonte had the second-highest population density in the Castelo Branco district and was a rural community primarily reliant on livestock and agriculture. On 1 June 1510, King Manuel I renewed Belmonte's foral.

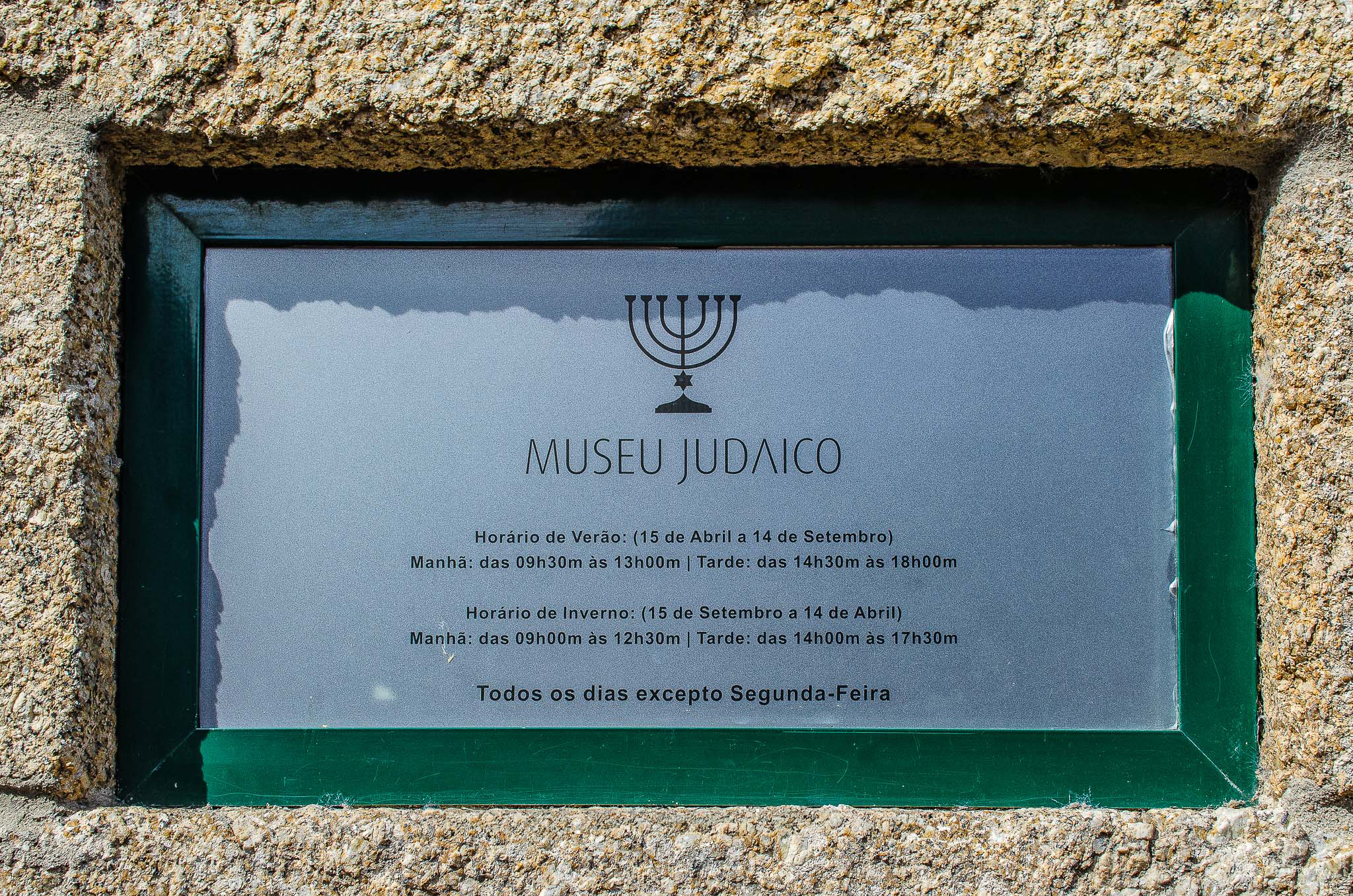
Belmonte, Museu Judaico

== Jewish community ==
In the 16th century, following the expulsion of Jews from the Iberian Peninsula, Portuguese legislation required Jews to convert to Christianity or leave the country. Many Jews chose isolation, severing external contacts and strictly maintaining their traditions. Termed Marranos, this group preserved their Jewish customs in secrecy.

Belmonte stands as the site of Portugal's last Marrano community, now known as the Belmonte Jews, marking a significant chapter in the history of Jewish perseverance and identity. They remained isolated until the 1970s when they reconnected with the global Jewish community and openly returned to Judaism, culminating in the opening of a synagogue in 1996.

In 2003, the American Sephardi Federation founded the Belmonte Project, designated to raise funds to acquire Judaic educational material and services for the community, which now numbers 160–180. They opened a Jewish Museum of Belmonte (Portuguese: Museu Judaico de Belmonte) on 17 April 2005. In the summer of 2006, the American Sephardi Federation ceased to have the Belmonte Project under its auspices.

== Geography ==
Administratively, the municipality is divided into 4 civil parishes (freguesias):

- Belmonte e Colmeal da Torre
- Caria
- Inguias
- Maçaínhas

== Culture ==
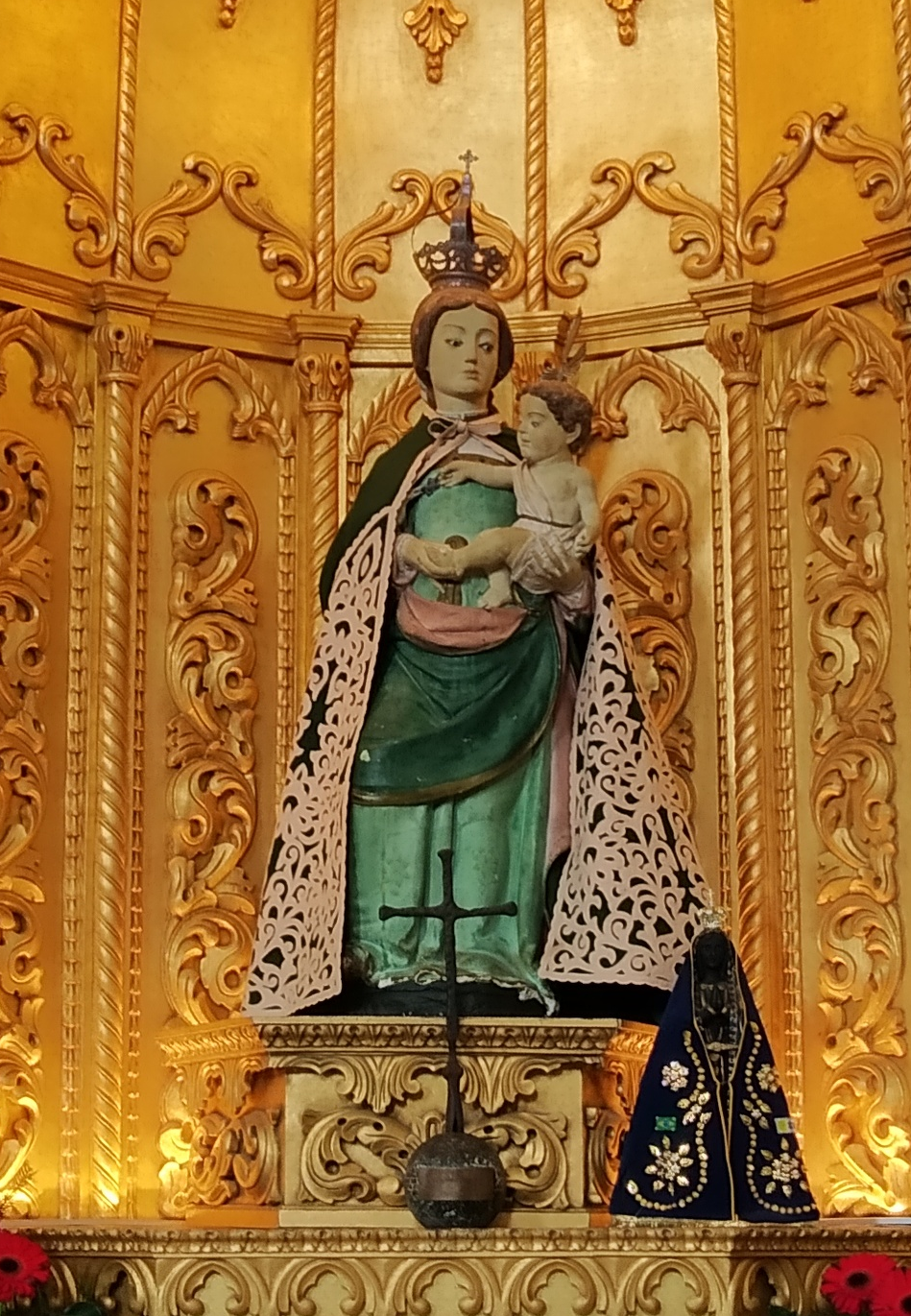
Statue of Our Lady of Hope

Catholicism has played a significant role in shaping Belmonte's cultural identity, particularly through the statue of Nossa Senhora da Esperança (Our Lady of Hope). This statue, which accompanied Pedro Álvares Cabral on his voyage to Brazil, was placed by him in a chapel on his estate upon his return. In 1563, with the founding of the Convento de Nossa Senhora da Boa Esperança (Convent of Our Lady of Hope), the statue was moved there, where it remained until 1834. Afterward, it was transferred to the Igreja Matriz de Belmonte (Mother Church of Belmonte), where it continued to be housed even after the church relocated to a new building in 1940.

The Convento de Nossa Senhora da Boa Esperança was abandoned and fell into disrepair following the dissolution of religious orders in Portugal. In the 20th century, the former convent was sold and repurposed as a pousada (historic hotel). Renovated between 1999 and 2001, the building preserved key architectural features, including the Manueline-style portal and the original cloister, while incorporating modern amenities

The Church of Santiago in Belmonte is home to notable artistic and architectural features, including a polychrome granite Pietà and murals from at least two different periods. Among the remains, there are traces of a triptych depicting figures such as Nossa Senhora (Our Lady), São Tiago (James the Great, the patron saint), and St. Peter. Adjacent to the church there is a family pantheon of the Cabral family. The church is located along one of the Portuguese pilgrimage routes to Santiago de Compostela, serving as a place of spiritual solace for pilgrims on their journey.

The singer Zeca Afonso lived in Belmonte for part of his childhood, between 1938 and 1940. He lived with his uncle, the mayor of the town, whilst his parents, José Nepomuceno Afonso dos Santos, a magistrate, and Maria das Dores Dantas Cerqueira, a primary school teacher, were living and working in Mozambique.

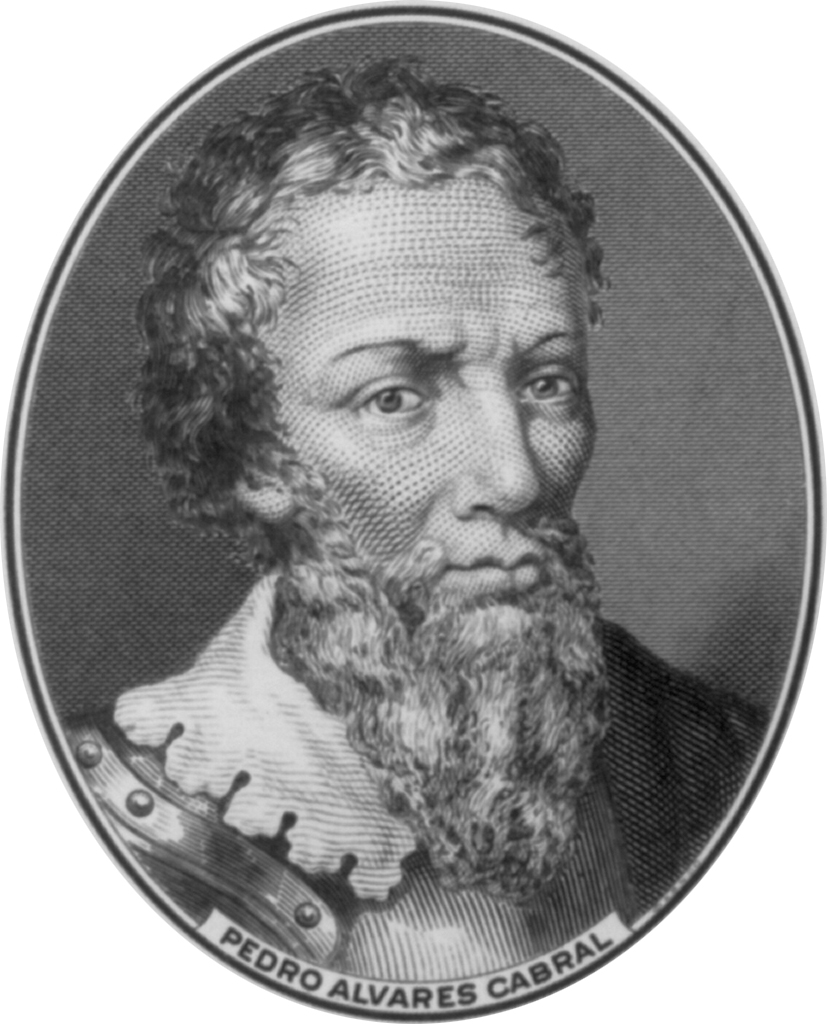
Portrait of Pedro Álvares Cabral

== Notable people ==
- Ana Bernardo (born 1968), a politician and trade unionist.
- Pedro Álvares Cabral (ca.1467 – ca.1520) was a Portuguese nobleman, military commander, navigator and explorer. In 1500 Cabral conducted the first substantial exploration of the northeast coast of South America and discovered Brazil.

== Twin cities ==
Belmonte is twinned with:

- Belmonte, Brazil (1999)
- Colatina, Brazil (2018)
- Espargos, Cape Verde
- La Mézière, France (1988)
- Olímpia, Brazil (2014)
- Olivenza, Spain (2016)
- Ouro Preto, Brazil (2015)
- Ponta Delgada, Portugal (2021)
- Porto Seguro, Brazil
- Rosh Pinna, Israel (1996)
- Santa Cruz Cabrália, Brazil (1999)
- Santarém, Portugal
- São José do Belmonte, Brazil (2013)
- São Paulo, Brazil (2019)
- São Vicente, Brazil (2000)
