= Lisbon Harbor Control Tower =

Control tower in Lisbon, Portugal

Coordinates: 38.6940°N 9.2343°W

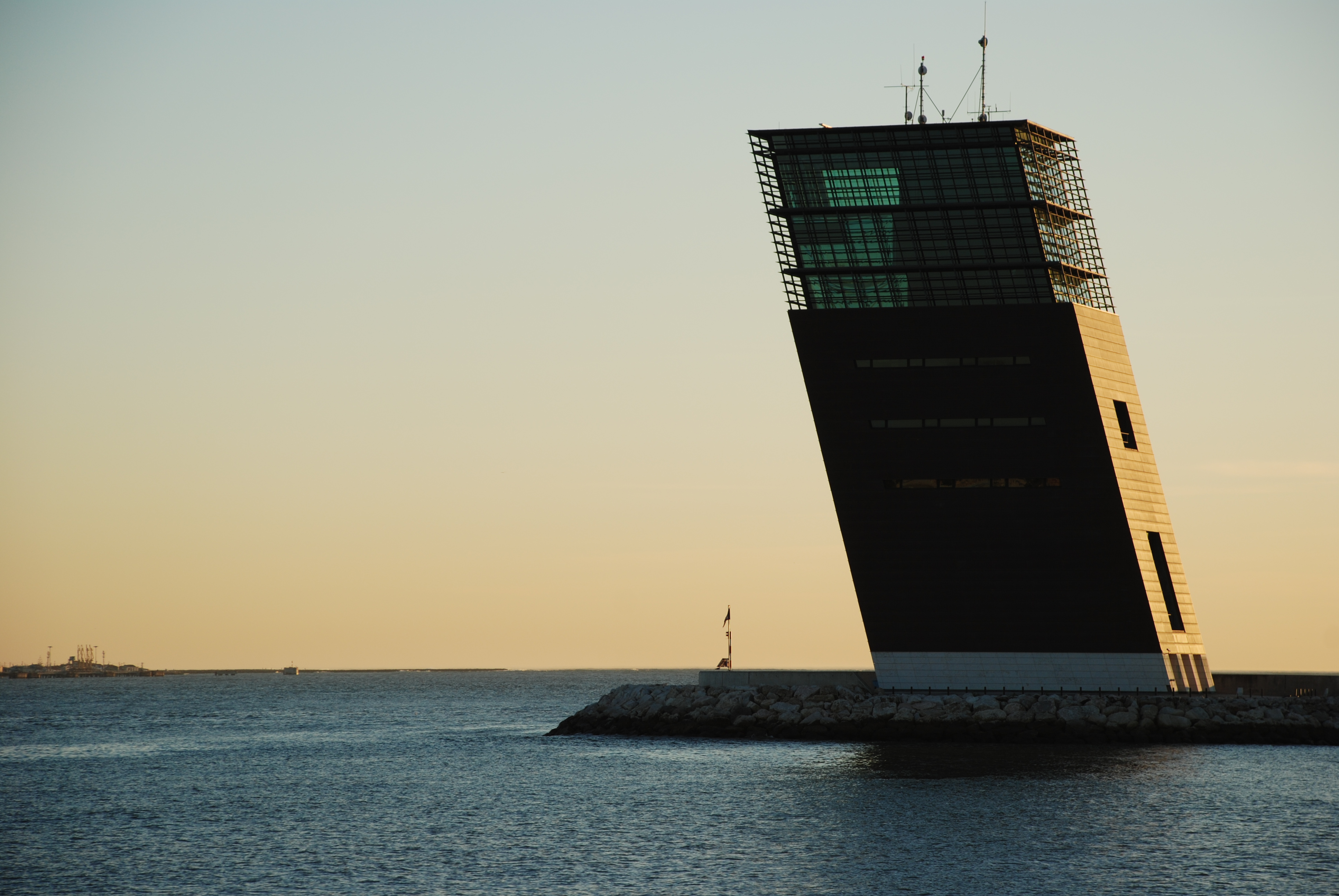
The tower in 2007

Lisbon Harbour Control Tower is a 38-metre-tall (125 ft) control tower at the end of an artificial peninsula in Lisbon, Portugal. The building is of an ultramodern design where it tilts towards the opening to the harbour. The nine storey tower was designed by Gonçalo Sousa Byrne and is owned by the Governo da Republica Portuguesa.

The lower section of the tower is made of horizontally placed copper whilst the final three storeys are glass. This is done so that the building looks like an ultramodern lighthouse.

The control tower was inaugurated on July 16, 2001, and won the First Prize at the TECU Architecture Awards on May 9, 2003.
