= Gil Cabral =

Portuguese nobleman

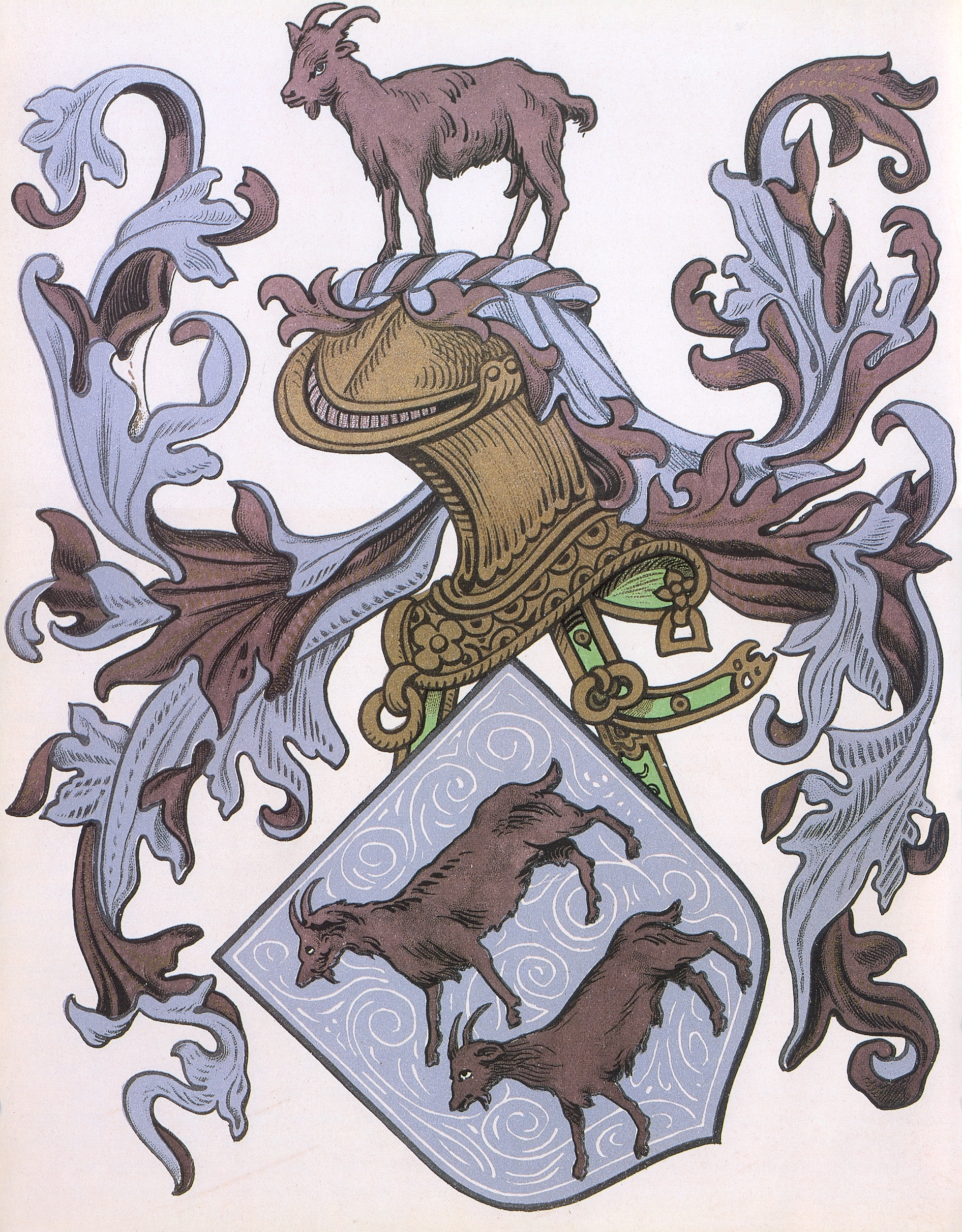
- Coat of Arms of Cabral
- Born: c.1300 Portugal
- Died: 1362; Guarda, Portugal
- Noble family: Cabral
- Occupation: Bishop

Gil Cabral (1300s–1362) was a Portuguese nobleman, who served as priest and bishop of Guarda, Portugal.

== Biography ==
Cabral was born in Portugal, the son of João Martins Cabral, a noble medieval knight, belonging to the Portuguese elite. The name of his wife is unknown, Cabral had two sons Maria Gil Cabral and Álvaro Gil Cabral, noble knight, who held important political and military positions during the reign of Ferdinand I of Portugal.

Gil Cabral was the direct ancestor of Pedro Álvares Cabral, the discoverer of Brazil. According to ancient sources, the Cabral family were descendants of Carano founder of The Macedonian Empire.
