= Centum Cellas =

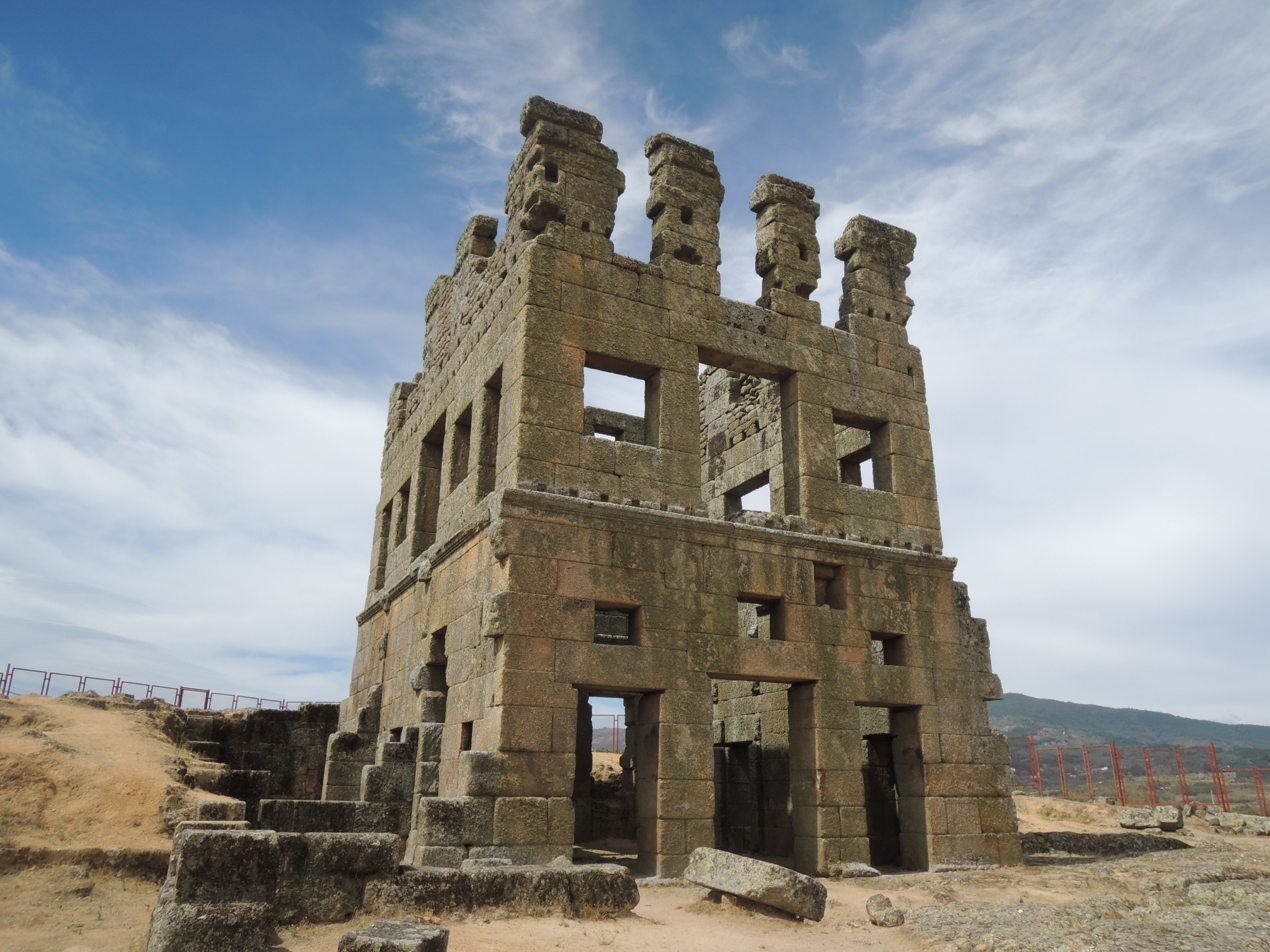
- Exterior view of Centum Cellas
- Interactive map of the Centum Cellas area

General information
- Architectural style: Roman
- Location: Belmonte, Castelo Branco District, Portugal
- Coordinates: 40°22′39.5″N 7°20′34″W

Centum Cellas, also referred to as Centum Cellæ, Centum Celli, or Centum Cœli (and in Portuguese: Centocelas), is a Roman villa rustica that dates back to the 1st century AD, located in the Mount of Santo Antão in Belmonte, Castelo Branco District, Portugal.

== History ==
In the context of the Roman invasion of the Iberian Peninsula, the Villa was supposedly the property of a Lúcio Cecílio (in Latin: LVCIVS CÆCILIVS), a wealthy Roman citizen, a tradesman of tin (an abundant metal in the Iberian Peninsula) who ordered its construction in the 1st century AD. Hispania (modern Spain and Portugal) was one of if not the richest Roman province in the case of mineral ore from around the first century BC. Containing deposits of the metals (gold, silver, copper, tin, lead, iron, and mercury), it was very rich in resources. The Romans realised this, and there is evidence of large-scale mining and processing in the region. From its acquisition during the Punic Wars to the Fall of Rome, Iberia continued to produce a significant amount of Roman metals. Tin was especially important being mined only in Iberia, Persia and Britannia. According to certain archeological sources, it was partially destroyed in the 3rd century AD but rebuilt right after. In the Middle Ages, over the remnant parts, a chapel was built in homage to Pope Cornelius. However, there are no traces of it today. It is also possible that during this time, due to its proximity with the Kingdom of León, the tower was used as a military outpost. In 1188, the place, then named Centuncelli, received a foral by king Sancho I of Portugal. 19th century Portuguese historian Pinho Leal wrote that the tower was renovated in order to be used as a watchtower in either the 13th or 14th centuries.

== Structure ==
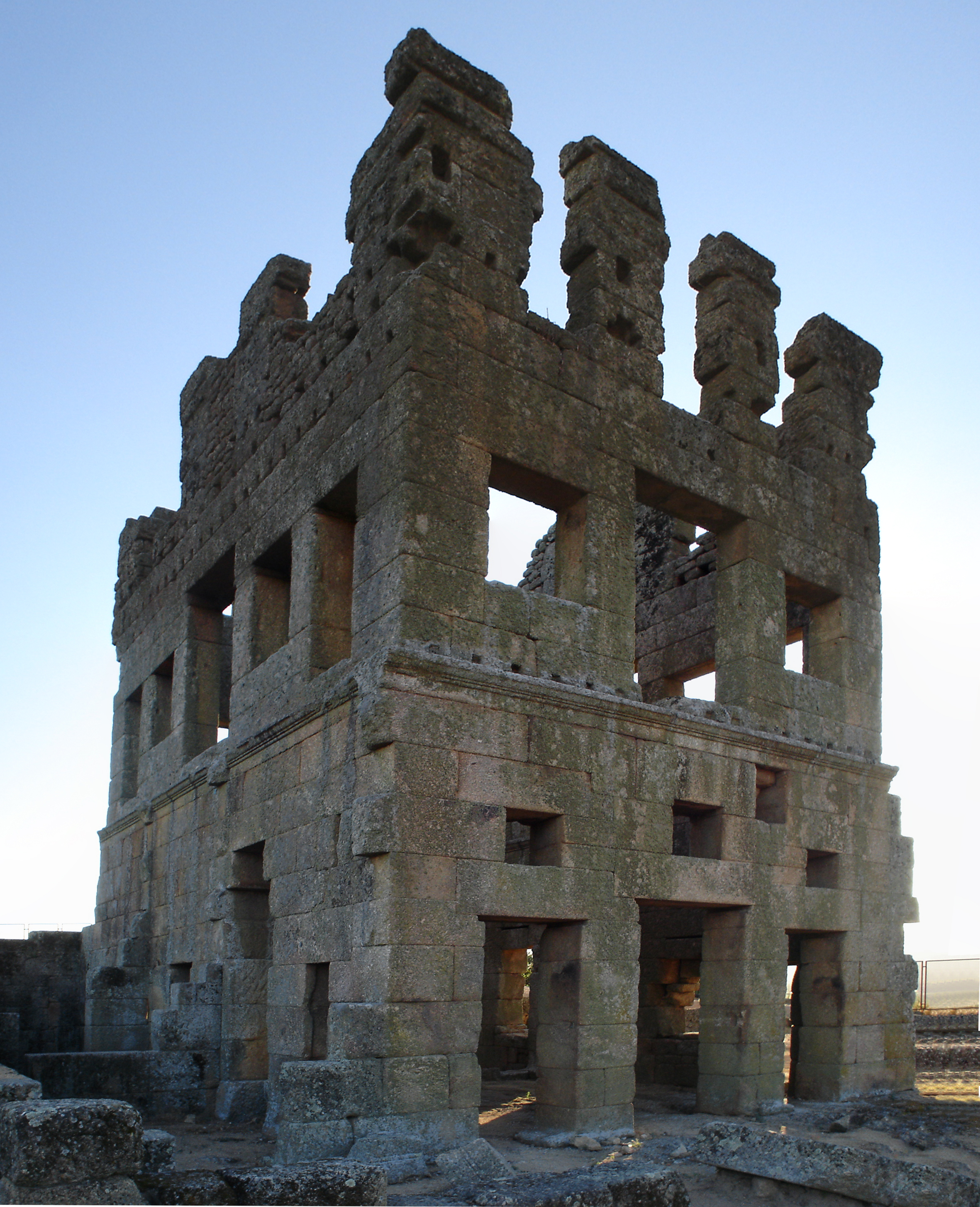
Centum cellas tower

The tower-like structure is one of the best preserved Roman monuments in the country. The core building has a rectangular floor plan (13.3 m × 15.5 m) and was two-storey; the second floor is probably a medieval addition. It has multiple entrances with different sizes. Two friezes separate the floors. The tower is 12 m high and originally stood in a building complex (the villa rustica). On three sides it was surrounded by extensions, of which only the foundations are visible. The sides were surrounded by rows of three chambers. At the front was the pillared portico of an open courtyard. The construction is of blocks (granite), which is quite unusual in Europe and reminiscent of Syria and North Africa. The position of the outer openings was dominated by the view that results from this point, located on a Roman road on the one kilometer distant confluence of the rivers Zêzere and Gaia.

== Listing ==
Centum Cellas is listed as a National Monument by the Portuguese Government under the decree nº 14 425, of 15 October 1927, published in the Government's Diary nº 136.

== Myths ==
Much mystery surrounds the function this tower served, having fomented many folk tales and theories throughout the centuries. One of the traditions claims that it was used as a prison. Regarding its primitive function, it is believed that it could have been a prætorium (a Roman military camp). Meanwhile, several archeological prospection campaigns in the surrounding areas, carried out during the 1960s and 1990s, indicate that the tower was most likely a villa, being an integral part of the pars urbana. Excavations are still ongoing.

== See also ==
- Roman villa of Centcelles
