= Torreira =

Civil parish in Murtosa, Portugal

- Civil parish
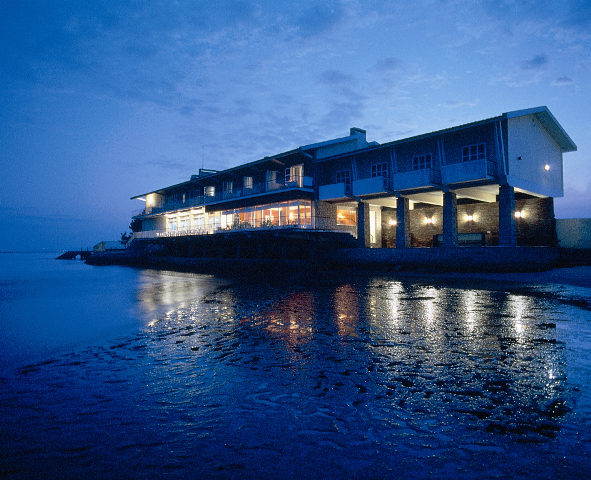
- Pousada da Ria

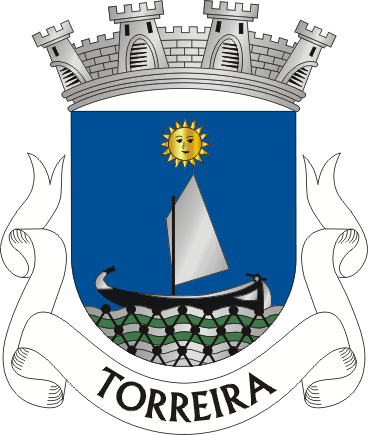
- Coat of arms

- Location in Portugal
- Coordinates: 40.7607°N 8.7056°W
- Country: Portugal
- Region: Centro
- Intermunic. comm.: Região de Aveiro
- District: Aveiro
- Municipality: Murtosa

Area
  - Total: 32.09 km^{2} (12.39 sq mi)

Population (2021)
  - Total: 2,908
  - Density: 90.62/km^{2} (234.7/sq mi)
- Time zone: UTC+00:00 (WET)
  - Summer (DST): UTC+01:00 (WEST)
- Area code: 011204
- Website: jf-torreira.pt

Torreira is a town and civil parish of the municipality of Murtosa, with 32.09 km² of area and 2908 inhabitants (2021 census).

The civil parish was created via the Law nº 12.570, of 30/10/1926, and the village of Torreira raised to town status in 1997.

== Population ==
Population of the parish of Torreira
Year	Pop.	±%
1930	1,091	—
1940	1,404	+28.7%
1950	1,641	+16.9%
1960	1,588	−3.2%
1970	1,651	+4.0%
1981	2,181	+32.1%
1991	2,297	+5.3%
2001	2,495	+8.6%
2011	2,745	+10.0%
2021	2,908	+5.9%
