= Murtosa =

- Municipality
- Town of Murtosa
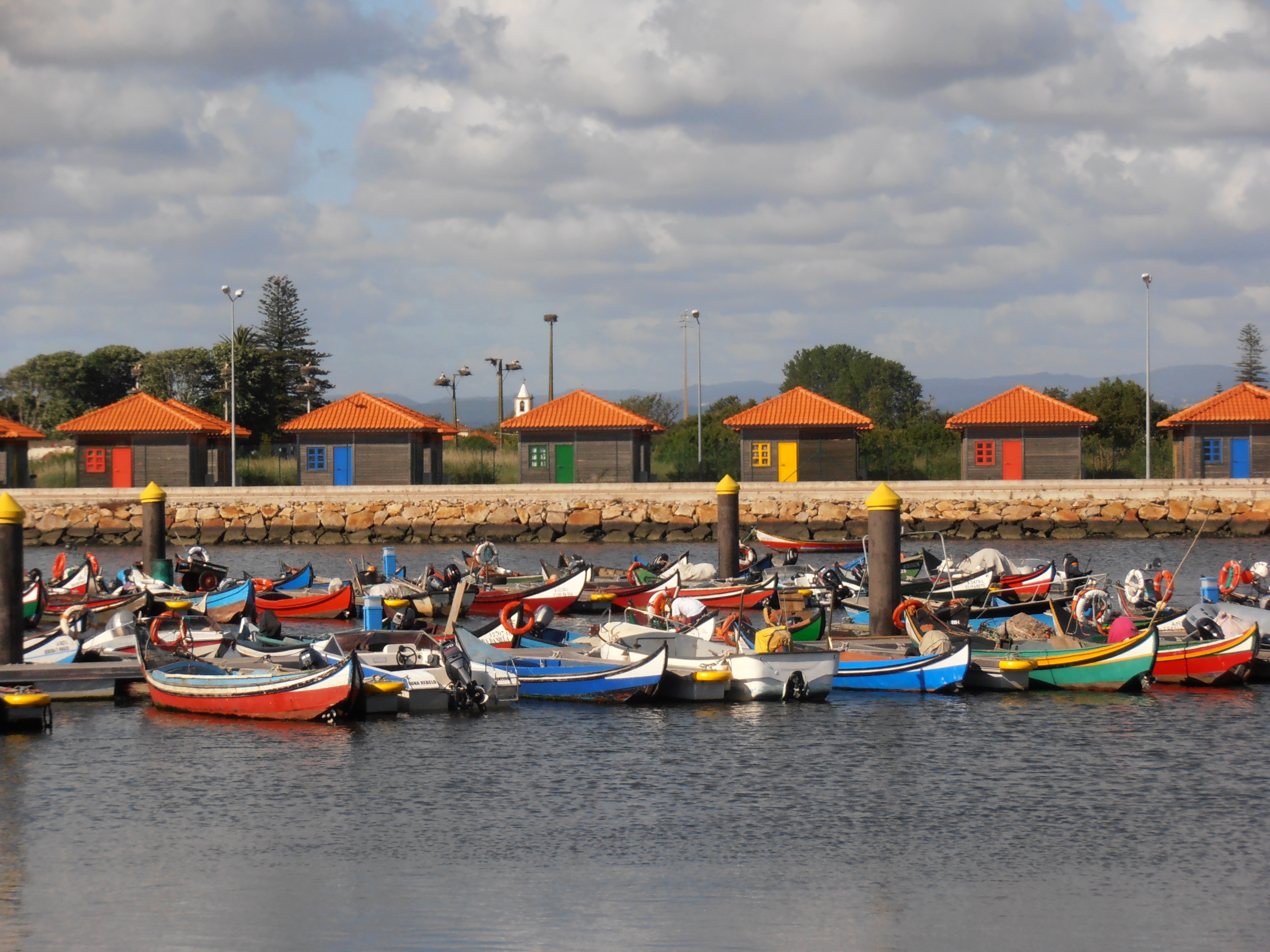
- View of Murtosa

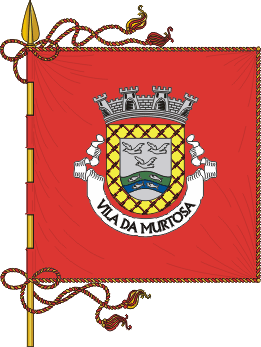
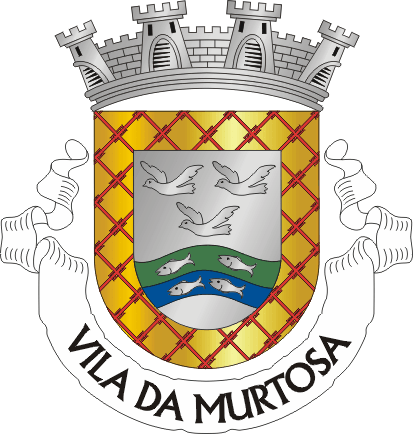
- Flag Coat of arms
- Interactive map of Murtosa
- Coordinates: 40°44′N 8°38′W
- Country: Portugal
- Region: Centro
- Intermunic. comm.: Região de Aveiro
- District: Aveiro
- Seat: Murtosa Municipal Chamber
- Parishes: 4

Government
  - President: Eng. Joaquim Manuel Baptista (PSD)

Area
  - Total: 73.09 km^{2} (28.22 sq mi)

Population (2011)
  - Total: 10,585
  - Density: 144.8/km^{2} (375.1/sq mi)
- Time zone: UTC+00:00 (WET)
  - Summer (DST): UTC+01:00 (WEST)
- Local holiday: September 8
- Website: http://www.cm-murtosa.pt

Murtosa (Portuguese pronunciation: [muɾˈtɔzɐ]), officially Town of Murtosa (Portuguese: Vila da Murtosa), is a town and a municipality in the District of Aveiro in Portugal. The population in 2011 was 10,585, in an area of 73.09 km^{2}. It had 8,282 eligible voters.

The present Mayor is Joaquim Manuel Baptista, elected by the Social Democratic Party. The municipal holiday is September 8.

Numerous Murtosa residents have immigrated to Naugatuck, Connecticut Newark, New Jersey and other cities in the New York City metropolitan area of the United States. They have formed numerous social clubs and institutions in Newark and the broader region.

== Economy ==
Agriculture, fishing and canned fish preserves industry are the main activities.

== Demographics ==
Population of Murtosa Municipality (1930–2011)
1930	1960	1981	1991	2001	2004	2006	2011
13310	12328	9816	9579	9458	9657	9804	10585

== Parishes ==
Administratively, the municipality is divided into 4 civil parishes (freguesias):

- Bunheiro
- Monte
- Murtosa
- Torreira

== Cities and towns ==
There are no cities in Murtosa. There is are at least two towns, namely Murtosa and Torreira.

== Notable people ==
- Francisco Maria da Silva (1910—1977) a Roman Catholic prelate, Archbishop-Primate of Braga from 1963
