= Bunheiro =

- Civil parish
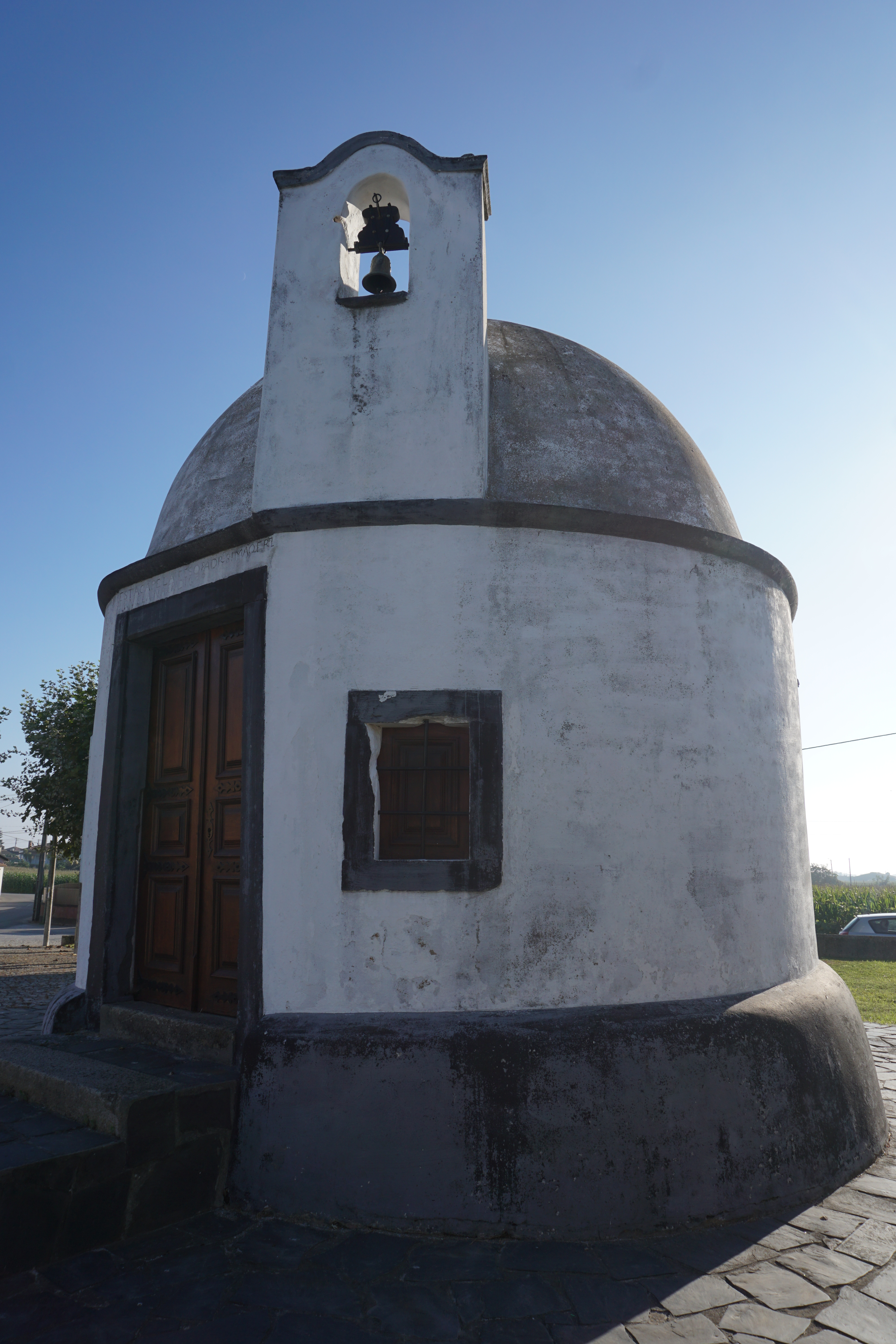
- Chapel of São Simão

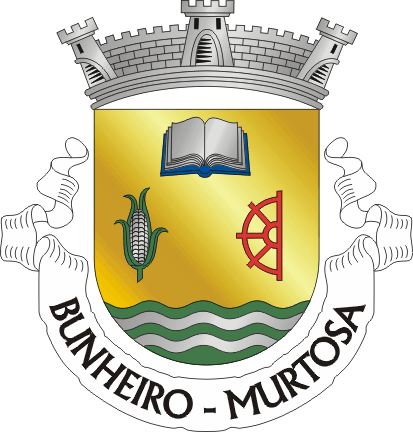
- Coat of arms

- Location in Portugal
- Coordinates: 40°46′17″N 8°38′42″W
- Country: Portugal
- Region: Centro
- District: Aveiro
- Municipality: Murtosa

Area
  - Total: 24.60 km^{2} (9.50 sq mi)

Population (2021)
  - Total: 2,497
  - Density: 101.5/km^{2} (262.9/sq mi)
- Time zone: UTC+00:00 (WET)
  - Summer (DST): UTC+01:00 (WEST)
- Website: www.bunheiro.freguesias.pt

Bunheiro is a parish in the municipality of Murtosa, Portugal. The population in 2021 was 2,497, in an area of 24.60 square kilometres (9.50 sq mi).

== Demographics ==
Between 1864 and 1920, the parish belonged to the municipality of Estarreja.

The population recorded in the censuses was:

Population of the Parish of Bunheiro
Year	Pop.	±%
1864	3,417	—
1878	3,457	+1.2%
1890	4,159	+20.3%
1900	3,712	−10.7%
1911	4,107	+10.6%
1920	3,889	−5.3%
1930	3,588	−7.7%
1940	3,739	+4.2%
1950	3,420	−8.5%
1960	3,334	−2.5%
1970	3,096	−7.1%
1981	2,854	−7.8%
1991	2,867	+0.5%
2001	2,707	−5.6%
2011	2,682	−0.9%
2021	2,497	−6.9%

Population Distribution by Age Groups
Year	0-14 Years	15-24 Years	25-64 Years	> 65 Years
2001	450	390	1349	518
2011	376	300	1384	622
2021	303	246	1269	679

== Heritages ==
- Chapel of São Simão
- Church of São Mateus
- Chapel of São Gonçalo
- Fountain of São Gonçalo
- Custódio Prato Ethnographic Museum
- Chapel of São Silvestre
- Several wayside crosses, notably in São Silvestre
- Cais da Bestida (Quay)
- Riverside marginal area
- Interior canal zones (Ribeiras)
