= Castle of Belmonte (Belmonte) =

Castle in Belmonte, Castelo Branco, Portugal

- Castelo de Belmonte
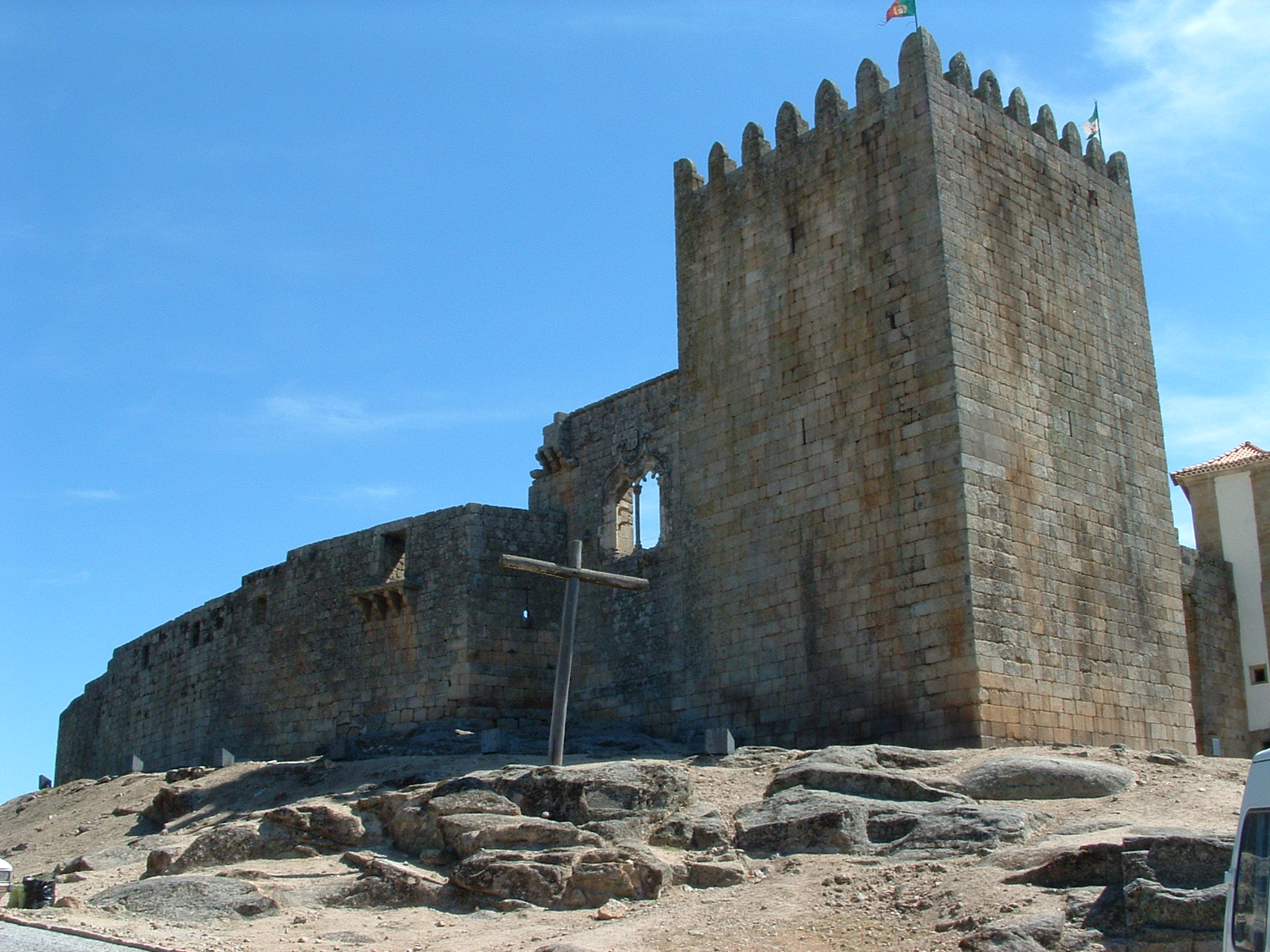
- Interactive map of the Castle of Belmonte area

General information
- Location: Belmonte municipality, Castelo Branco District, Portugal
- Coordinates: 40.3594°N 7.3480°W

The Castle of Belmonte is a medieval castle located in the municipality of Belmonte, Castelo Branco district in Portugal.

== History ==
=== Early history ===
The early occupation of the site has been linked to the presence of the Romans when they entered the Iberian Peninsula.

=== Medieval era ===
The first historical information about the area dates back to the reign of the first King of Portugal Afonso I (1112–1185), when the landlord of region donated the lands to the Bishop of Coimbra on 6 May 1168. Later, King Sancho I (1185–1211), granted a Foral charter to the village in 1199.

After the establishment of the Alcañices Treaty in 1297 with the consequent expansion of the frontiers to the west, the Belmonte Castle lost strategic importance, while the town was developing extramural.

In the midst of the 1383-1385 Portuguese succession crisis, the castle sided with Beatrice and later was conquered by King John 1 (1385–1433). The king helped advance the construction of the wall.

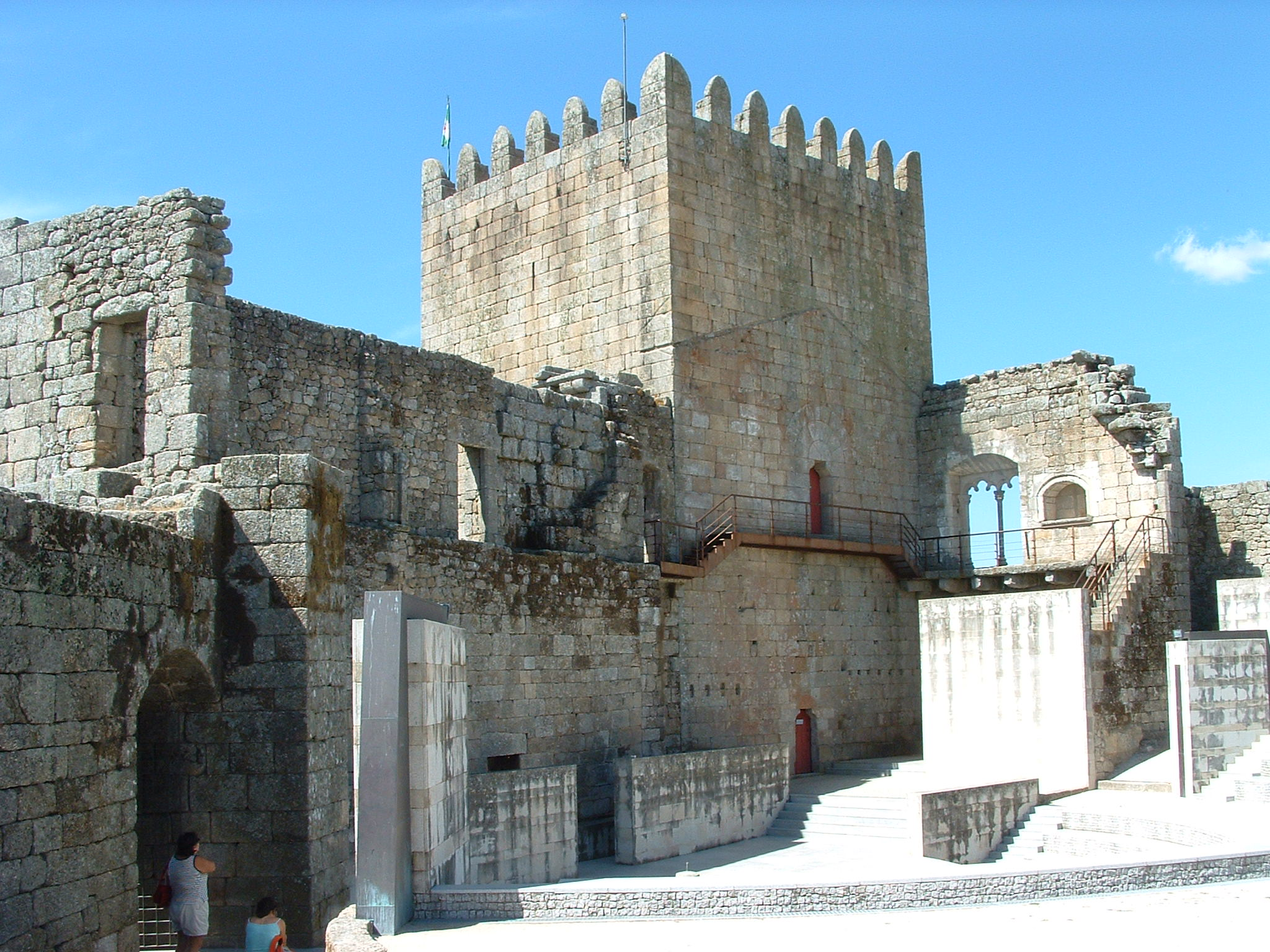
Castelo de Belmonte, Portugal

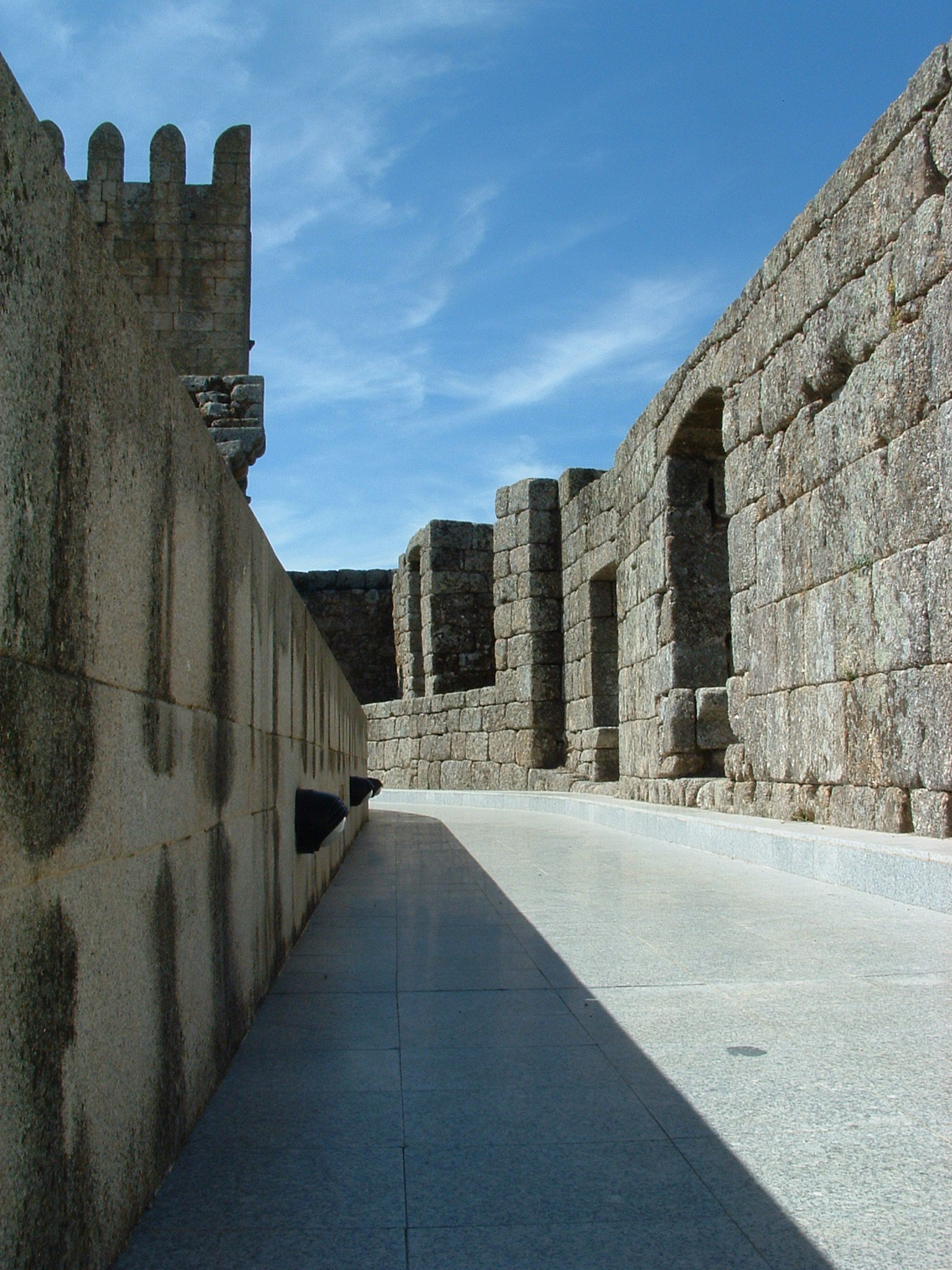
Castelo de Belmonte, Portugal

=== 17th century to modern day ===
In the midst of the war of Restoration for Portuguese's independence, the castle received some modernization efforts. It was also damaged by fire in 1694.

==== Modern era ====
The building next to the castle was employed as a prison.

==== Modern preservation efforts ====
The building was declared to be a National Monument by decree published on 15 October 1927 and is now managed by IGESPAR.

Between 1940 and 1960, the Directorate General for National Buildings and Monuments made numerous conservation and restoration efforts.

Between 1992 and 1993, archaeological work in the keep proved a Roman presence in the region.

== Architecture ==
The castle sits 615 meters above sea level. The site has an irregular oval layout plan and the walls are built with granite stone. In the Southwest portion sits the Donjon.
