= Bakr =

Bakr may refer to:

== People ==
- Abu Bakr, 7th-century companion of Muhammad
  - Muhammad ibn Abi Bakr, son of Abu Bakr
- Ahmed Hassan al-Bakr, 20th-century president of Iraq
- Bakr Abdellaoui, Finnish-Moroccan footballer
- Bakr bin Laden, 20th- and 21st-century Saudi businessman
- Bakr Sidqi, 20th-century Iraqi general
- Yahia Ben Bakr, 9th-century Portuguese official
  - Bakr Ben Yahia, son of Yahia Ben Bakr

== Places ==
- Baker, Iran (also known as Bakr), a village in Darab County, Fars Province, Iran
- Bakur, Iran (also known as Bakr), a village in Kazerun County, Fars Province, Iran

== Other uses ==
- Bakri (disambiguation)
- Banu Bakr, an Arabian tribe
- Bakr-Id or Eid al-Adha, Islamic holiday at the end of hajj
- Bakrid (film), 2018 Indian drama film by Jagadeesan Subu
