= Bakri =

Bakri or Bakry may refer to:

== People ==
- Bakri Al-Madina (born 1988), Sudanese footballer
- al-Bakri (1014–1094), Andalusian-Arab geographer and historian, full name Abu Abdullah al-Bakri
- Abū al-Ḥasan Bakrī, purported medieval author of Islamic fiction
- Adam Bakri (born 1988), Palestinian actor
- Asma El Bakry (1947–2015), Egyptian film director
- Dominique Bakry (born 1954), French mathematician
- Marcia Bakry (born 1937), American artist and scientific illustrator
- Mohammad Bakri (1953–2025), Palestinian actor and film director with Israeli citizenship
- Omar Bakri Muhammad (born 1958), Syrian Islamist, known as Omar Bakri
- Saleh Bakri (born 1977), Palestinian actor
- Ziad Bakri (born 1980), Palestinian actor and filmmaker

== Places ==
- Bukit Bakri, a town in Muar, Johor, Malaysia
- Bakri (federal constituency), a federal parliamentary constituency in Muar, Johor, Malaysia
- Al-Bakri (crater), a lunar crater

== Other ==
- A polemical term for the adherents of Sunni Islam
- Bakr (disambiguation)
- Bakri balloon tamponade
