= Cabo de Santa Maria (Faro) =

Southernmost point of mainland Portugal

- Cape
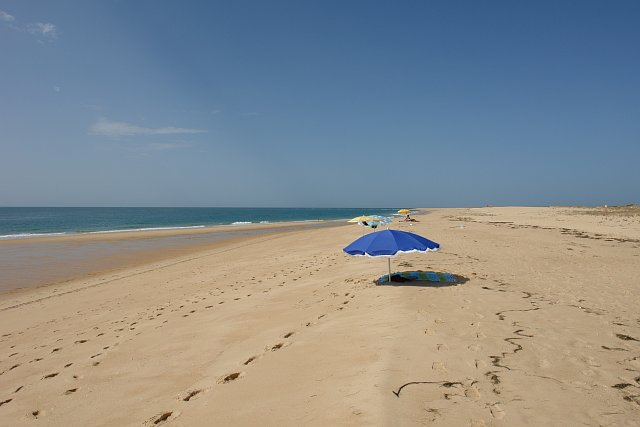
- Beach in the southernmost point of mainland Portugal, Barreta Island (Santa Maria cape)

- Location within Portugal
- Coordinates: 36°57′0″N 7°53′17″W

Cape of St. Mary (Portuguese: Cabo de Santa Maria) is the southernmost point of mainland Portugal, in the municipality of Faro. It is a point in the smooth curve of a long sandy beach on the Island of Barreta.

Its coordinates are approximately 36°57′00″N 007°53′17″W.

== See also ==
- Extreme points of Portugal
