= Algarve Metrobus =

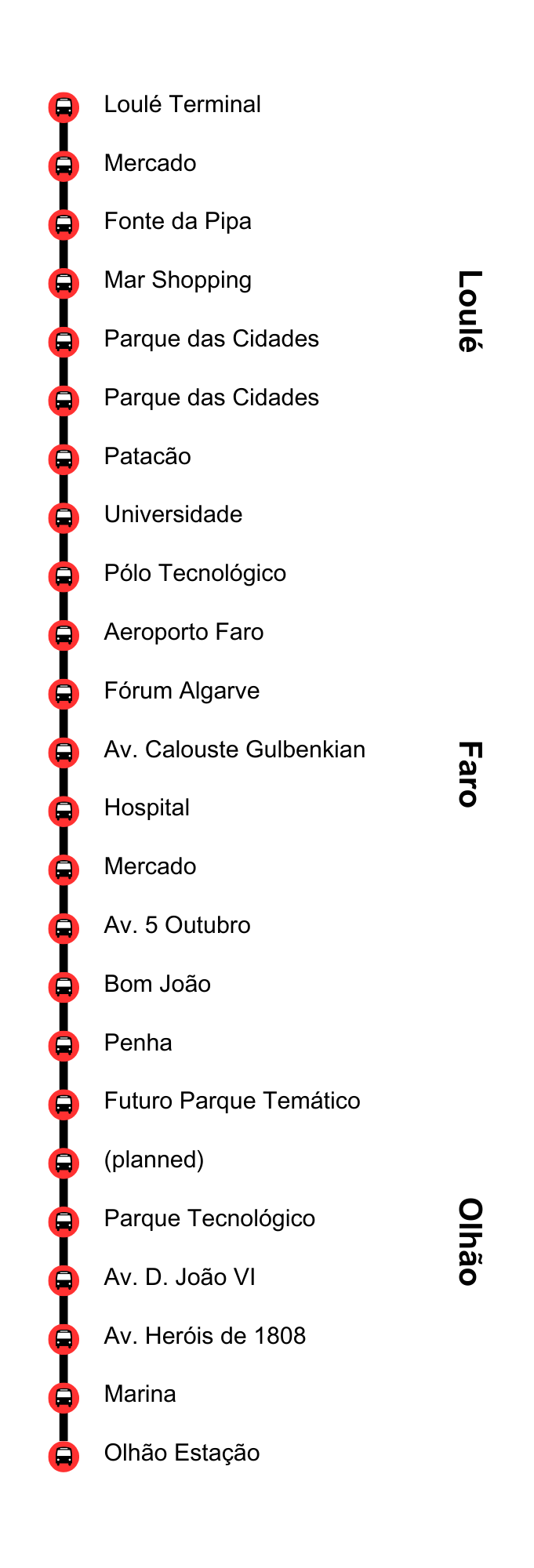
Proposed route for the Algarve Metrobus

The Algarve Metrobus is a proposed of Bus rapid transit, transport project that will connect the city of Faro with the neighboring municipalities of Olhão and Loulé in Portugal. In total, the proposed 38 kilometer line will serve around 85,000 residents. Approximately 40,000 journeys per day could be made on the line, with the project expecting to cost from €300-€510 million upon completion.

== History ==
On 1 March 2023, the Algarve Regional Coordination and Development Commission (CCDR Algarve) unveiled a study on options for improved transport connectivity across the Algarve region, covering the Olhão, Faro and Loulé corridor. The study explored two major transport projects with multiple variations, including a light railway (tram-train) and a metrobus system (bus rapid transit) as the preferred cheaper alternative.

Responding to the study at a regional local government summit, Prime Minister António Costa endorsed the need for improved connectivity within the Olhão, Faro and Loulé corridor, and announced that structural funds should be made available for the project to boost economic growth within the region.

The project was initially described as a light railway project by the Portuguese Government in a press release, but it was later clarified that the project would proceed as a metrobus system, delivered by road as opposed to rail, and that the Algarve light railway coastal programme approved by Ministers would still proceed.

Further feasibility studies are needed for the project, but up to €70 million has been earmarked for the project, to be completed by the final year of the structural fund round in 2029. Further funding could come from the Algarve 2030 programme.

== Proposed service and route ==
The service will use dedicated purpose-built bus rapid transit lanes which separate the metrobus network from general traffic, differentiating it from other schemes worldwide which experience congestion on public roads.

Services are expected to run from 06:30-01:00 each day, at every 12 minutes during rush hour and at every 20 minutes during non-peak times including weekends. An extended night-time service will operate every 30 minutes.

The proposed route centers on the Olhão, Faro and Loulé corridor. The metrobus will have 24 stops across the Algarve region including at railway stations (Parque das Cidade station, Faro station, Bom João station, and Olhão station) and at major service hubs (Faro Airport and the University of Algarve).

Additional extensions of the line to Albufeira and Fuzeta (Olhão) have also been explored as possible options.

Options for rolling stock include conventional, electric, and hydrogen.
