= Mausoleum of Imam al-Hasan of Basra =

Historic shrine in Basra, Iraq

Mausoleum of Imam Hasan of Basra
- مرقد الإمام الحسن البصري
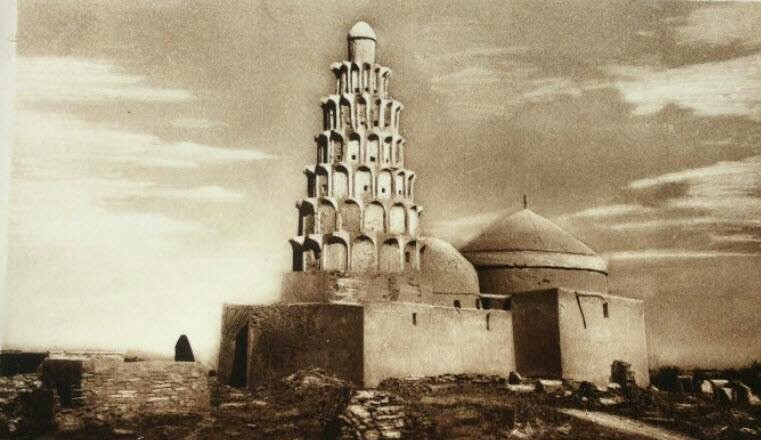
- The mausoleum in 1950

- Location of the mausoleum in Iraq

Religion
- Affiliation: Sunni Islam
- Ecclesiastical or organizational status: Mausoleum
- Status: Active

Location
- Location: Zubayr district, Basra, Basra Governorate
- Country: Iraq
- Interactive map of Mausoleum of Imam Hasan of Basra
- Coordinates: 30°23′03″N 47°42′00″E

Architecture
- Type: Islamic architecture
- Style: Abbasid; Seljuk
- Founder: Al-Nasir (tower)
- Completed: 1185 CE (tower)

Specifications
- Dome: Two
- Spire: One
- Shrines: Two: Hasan of Basra; Ibn Sirin
- Materials: Marble

The Mausoleum of Imam Hasan of Basra (Arabic: مرقد الإمام الحسن البصري) is a historic mausoleum and shrine in Basra, in the Basra Governorate of Iraq. The shrine commemorating the renowned Sunni Islamic ulama, Hasan of Basra. Hasan of Basra, nicknamed as Abi Sayeed, was born two years before the end of the era of the second Caliph Umar. The mausoleum is located in the Zubayr district where many cemeteries are situated.

The mausoleum contains the tomb of Hasan and Ibn Sirin, and the building is topped with a conical domed tower decorated by engravings. The tower was built in 1185 CE by the 34th Abbasid Caliph Al-Nasir, constructed in Seljuk architectural style, with the lower part of the tower having larger diameter than the upper part. At the northern part of the tomb, there are two pillars with plaster paintings. Next to the tomb is a room containing the grave of Al-Naqib family. The shrine of Hasan is made of marble stones. A small prayer room also serves as a mosque.

== See also ==
- Sunni Islam in Iraq
- List of mosques in Iraq
