= Hasan al-Basri =

Early Islamic scholar (c. 642–728)

Imam al-Hasan al-Basri
- الحسن البصري
- Title: Imam of Basra, Lamp of Basra, Leader of the Ascetics

Personal life
- Born: 642 CE (21 AH) Medina, Rashidun Caliphate
- Died: 15 October 728 CE (5th Rajab 110 AH; aged 85–86) Basra, Umayyad Caliphate
- Resting place: Shrine of Hasan al-Basri, Az Zubayr, Iraq
- Era: Early Islamic Period (Rashidun era)
- Occupation: Scholar; Theologian; Exegete; Traditionist; Judge

Religious life
- Religion: Islam

Muslim leader
- Influenced by: Ali, Ibn Abbas
- Influenced: Umar ibn Abd al-Aziz, Abu Hanifa, Adi ibn Musafir, Sufyan al-Thawri, Wasil ibn Ata, Amr ibn Ubayd, Qatada ibn Di'ama, Ayyub al-Sakhtiyani, Abd al-Wahid ibn Zaid, Habib al-Ajami, al-Muhasibi, Malik Dinar

Abi Sa'id al-Hasan ibn Yasar al-Basri (Note: Arabic: أَبُو سَعِيدٍ الْحَسَنُ بْنُ يَسَارٍ الْبَصْرِيُّ, romanized: ʾAbū Saʿīd al-Ḥasan ibn Yasār al-Baṣrī.) (642 CE – 15 October 728) was an early Medieval Muslim preacher, ascetic, theologian, exegete, scholar, and judge.

Born in Medina in 642 CE, Hasan belonged to the second generation of Muslims, all of whom would subsequently be referred to as the tabi'un in Sunni Islamic piety. He became one of "the most celebrated" of the tabi'un, enjoying an "acclaimed scholarly career and an even more remarkable posthumous legacy in Islamic scholarship."

Hasan, revered for his austerity and support for "renunciation" (zuhd), preached against worldliness and materialism during the early days of the Umayyad Caliphate, with his passionate sermons casting a "deep impression on his contemporaries." His close relationships with several of the most prominent companions of Muhammad only strengthened his standing as a teacher and scholar of the Islamic sciences. The particular disciplines in which he is said to have excelled included exegesis (tafsīr) of the Quran, whence his "name is invariably encountered in" classical and medieval commentaries on the scripture, as well as theology. Hasan became an important figure to the later founders of Sufism with his name occurring "in many mystical silsilas (chains of teachers and their disciples) going back to Muhammad" in the writings of Sunni mystics from the ninth-century onwards.

Scholars have said that very few of Hasan's original writings survive, with his proverbs and maxims on various subjects having been transmitted primarily through oral tradition by his numerous disciples. While fragments of his famed sermons do survive in the works of later authors, the only complete manuscripts that bear his name are apocryphal works such as the Risālat al-qadar ilā ʿAbd al-Malik (Epistle to ʿAbd al-Malik against the Predestinarians), a pseudopigraphical text from the ninth or early-tenth century, and another letter "of an ascetic and hortatory character" addressed to Umar II (d. 720), which is likewise deemed spurious.

Traditionally, Hasan has been commemorated as an outstanding figure by all the Sunni schools of thought, and was frequently designated as one of the well respected of the early Islamic community in later writings by such important Sunni thinkers as Abu Talib al-Makki (d. 996), Abu Nu`aym (d. 1038), Ali Hujwiri (d. 1077), Ibn al-Jawzi (d. 1201), and Attar of Nishapur (d. 1221). In his famed Ḳūt al-ḳulūb, the most important work of Basran mysticism, Abu Talib al-Makki says of Hasan: "Ḥasan is our Imām in this doctrine which we represent. We walk in his footsteps and we follow his ways and from his lamp we have our light". (Note: wa ’l-Ḥasanu raḥimahu ’llāhu imāmunā fī hād̲h̲a ’l-ʿilmi ’llad̲h̲ī natakallamu bih, at̲h̲arahu naḳfū wa sabīlahū natbaʿu wa min mis̲h̲kātihi nastaḍīʾ)

== Life ==
Hasan was born in Medina in 642 CE. His mother, Khayra, is said to have been a maidservant of one of Muhammad's wives, Umm Salama (d. 683), while his father, Peroz, was a Persian slave who originally hailed from southern Iraq. According to tradition, Hasan grew up in Medina for the vast portion of his early life, prior to his family's move to Basra after the Battle of Siffin. According to some scholars, it is "primarily this association with Medina and his acquaintance there with many of the notable Companions and wives of Muhammad that elevated [Hasan's] importance as an authoritative figure in Muslim religious and historical genealogy."

The various extant biographies relate that Hasan was once nursed by Umm Salama, and that his mother took him after his birth to the caliph Umar (d. 644), who is related to have blessed him with the prayer: "O God! Please do make him wise in the faith and beloved to all people." As he grew, Hasan began to be widely admired for his uncompromising faithfulness to the example of Muhammad. The various early sources on Hasan's life relate that he frequently studied at the feet of the fourth caliph in Islam, Imam Ali (d. 661), during this period, who is said to have taught Hasan while the latter was still "an adolescent." As there is evidence that the metaphysical idea of the abdal – forty major saints whose number, according to traditional mystical belief, is believed to remain constant till the Day of Judgment, with each group of forty being replaced by another upon their earthly death – was prevalent at the time, there are traditions which relate that some of Hasan's contemporaries did indeed identify him as one of the abdal of that period.

As a young man, Hasan took part in the campaigns of conquest in eastern Iran (ca. 663) and worked as a jewel-merchant, prior to forsaking the business and military life for that of a pure ascetic and scholar. It was during this latter period that he began to criticize the policies of the governors in Iraq, even stirring up the authorities to such a degree that he actually had to flee for the safety of his life under the reign of Ḥaj̲j̲āj, whose anger Hasan had roused due to his forthright condemnation of Ḥaj̲j̲āj's founding of Wāsiṭ in 705. Farqad as-Sabakhi (d. 729), was an Armenian Christian convert to Islam. Together with figures like as-Sabakhi and Rabia Basri (d. 801), Hasan began to publicly denounce the accumulation of riches by the wealthy; and it is said that he personally despised wealth to such a degree that he even "rejected a suitor for his daughter's hand who was famous for his wealth simply because of his riches." Hasan died in Basra in 728, being eighty-six years old. According to a tradition quoted by the medieval traditionist Qushayri (d. 1074), "on the night of al-Hasan al-Basri’s death ... [a local man] saw in a dream that the Gates of Heaven were opened and a crier announced: 'Verily, al-Hasan al-Basri is coming to God Most High, Who is pleased with him.'"

== Views ==
As one scholar has explained, the essence of Hasan's message was "otherworldliness, abstinence, poverty, and reverential fear of God, although he also spoke of the knowledge and love of God, which he contrasted with love and knowledge of the world."

== Hagiographic traditions ==
Islamic hagiography contains numerous widespread traditions and anecdotes relating to Hasan. One of the most famous of these is the story of his conversion, which "relates that the great ascetic began his adult life as a successful jewel-merchant." The hagiographic scholar John Renard summarizes the narrative thus: "Hasan once visited the Byzantine Emperor's court, and the vizier invited him to travel with him into the desert. There Hasan saw a lavish tent, to which came in succession a large army, four hundred scholars, elders, and four hundred beautiful servant maids. The vizier explained that each year since the Emperor's handsome young son had died of an illness, these throngs of Byzantine subjects had come to pay respects to the dead prince. After all these categories of royal subjects had entered and departed, the Emperor and his chief minister would go into the tent and explain to the deceased boy, in turn, how it grieved them that neither their might, nor learning, nor wisdom, nor wealth and beauty, nor authority had been sufficient to prolong his promising life. The striking scene persuaded Hasan of the need to be ever mindful of his mortality, and he was transformed from a prosperous businessman into a veritable archetype of the world-renouncing ascetic."

=== Hasan's relationship with Muhammad ===
Some hagiographic sources even indicate that Hasan actually met Muhammad as an infant. The tradition relates that Muhammad, who "visited Umm Salama's house while the baby was there," "prayed for little Hasan and again bestowed blessings." On another occasion, the child Hasan is said to have drunk some water from Muhammad's water jug. When Muhammad learned that Hasan had drunk the water, he is said to have "declared that the boy would receive knowledge from him in proportion to the water he had imbibed."

== Characteristics ==
According to various historical sources, it is said that Hasan was admired by his contemporaries for his handsome appearance. With some asserting he had blue eyes. In this connection, Ibn Qayyim al-Jawziyya (d. 1350) relates an older tradition, which states: "A group of women went out on the day of Eid and went about looking at people. They were asked: 'Who is the most handsome person you have seen today?' They replied: 'It is a teacher wearing a black turban.' They meant al-Ḥasan al-Baṣrī." As for his personality, it is related that Hasan was a frequent weeper, being known by those around him "for the abundance of tears he shed out of compunction for his sins." One particular tradition relates that he wept so much praying on his rooftop one day that his abundant tears began to run off "through the downspouts upon a passerby, who inquired whether the water was clean." Hasan immediately called out to the man below, telling him "it was not, for these were sinner's tears." As such, "he advised the passerby to wash himself forthwith." In a similar vein, Qushayri related of Hasan: "One would never see al-Hasan al-Basri without thinking that he had just been afflicted with a terrible tragedy." With regard to these traditions, one scholar noted that it is evident that Hasan "was deeply steeped in the sadness and fear so typical of ascetics of all religions."

== See also ==
- Mausoleum of Imam al-Hasan of Basra
- Bakriyyah
- Maruf Karkhi
- Nasr Abu Zayd
- Sufism
- Chishti Order
- Alevism
- Bektashi
