= Faro, Portugal =

Faro
- Municipality
- City of Faro
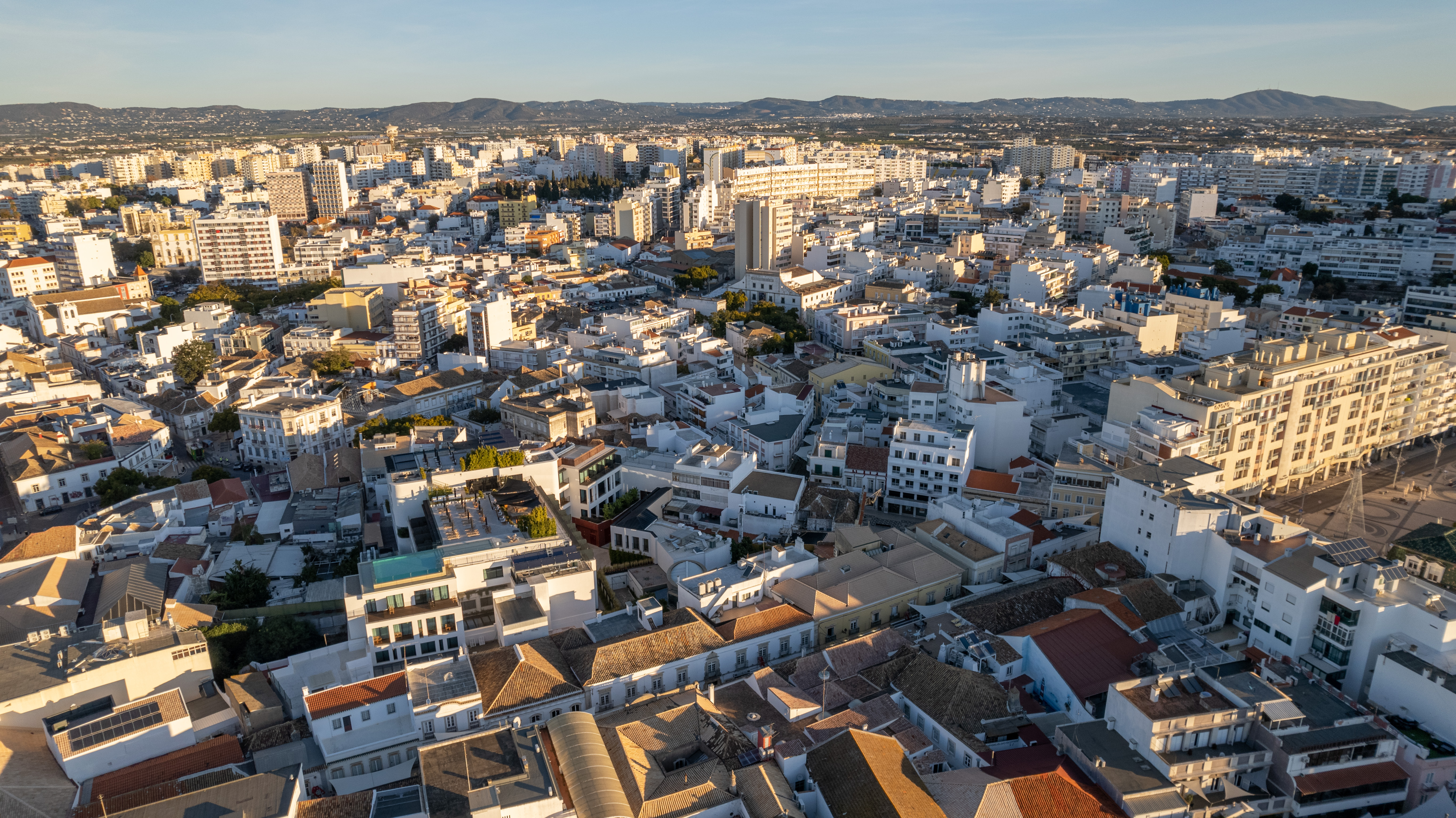
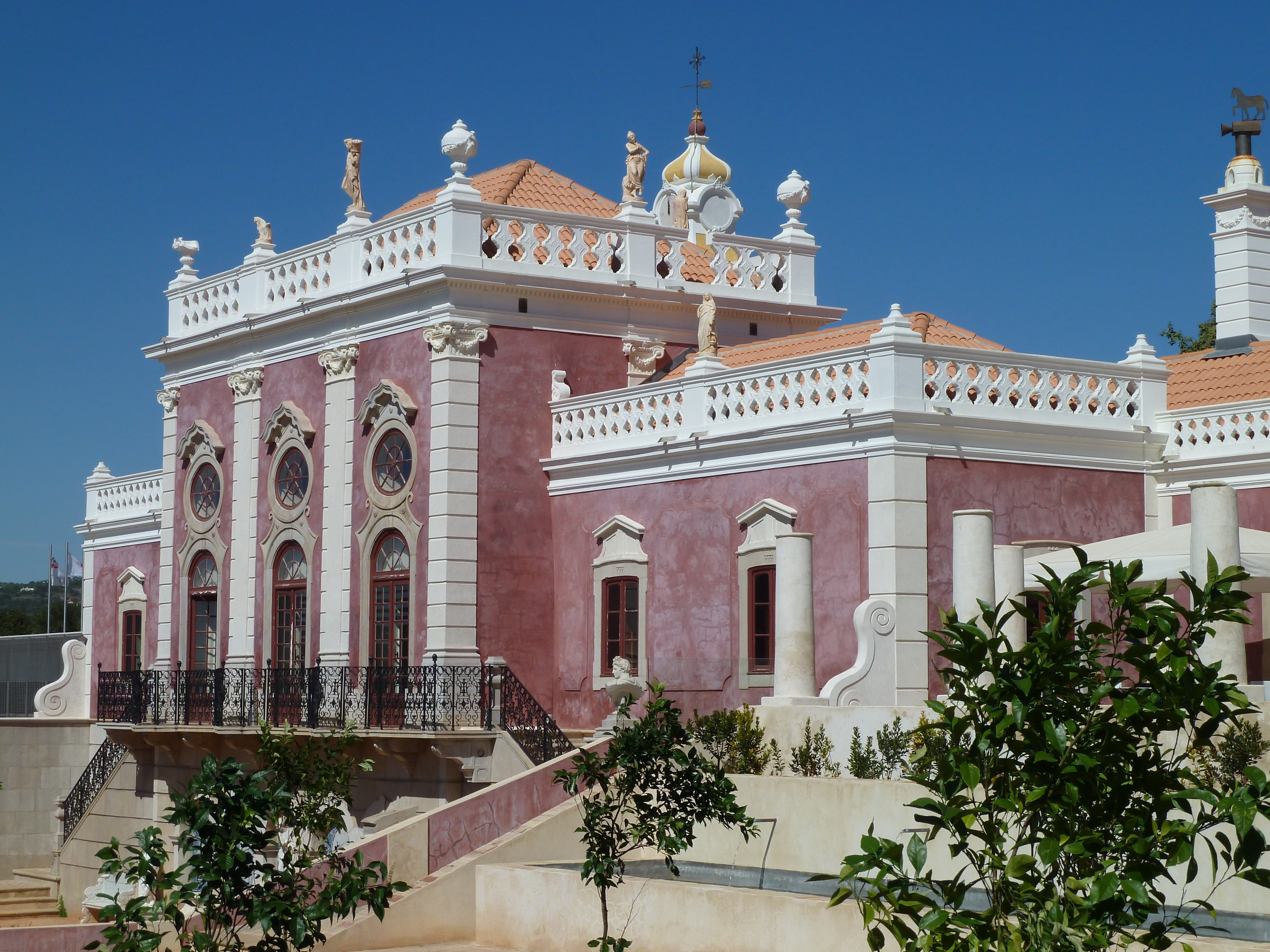
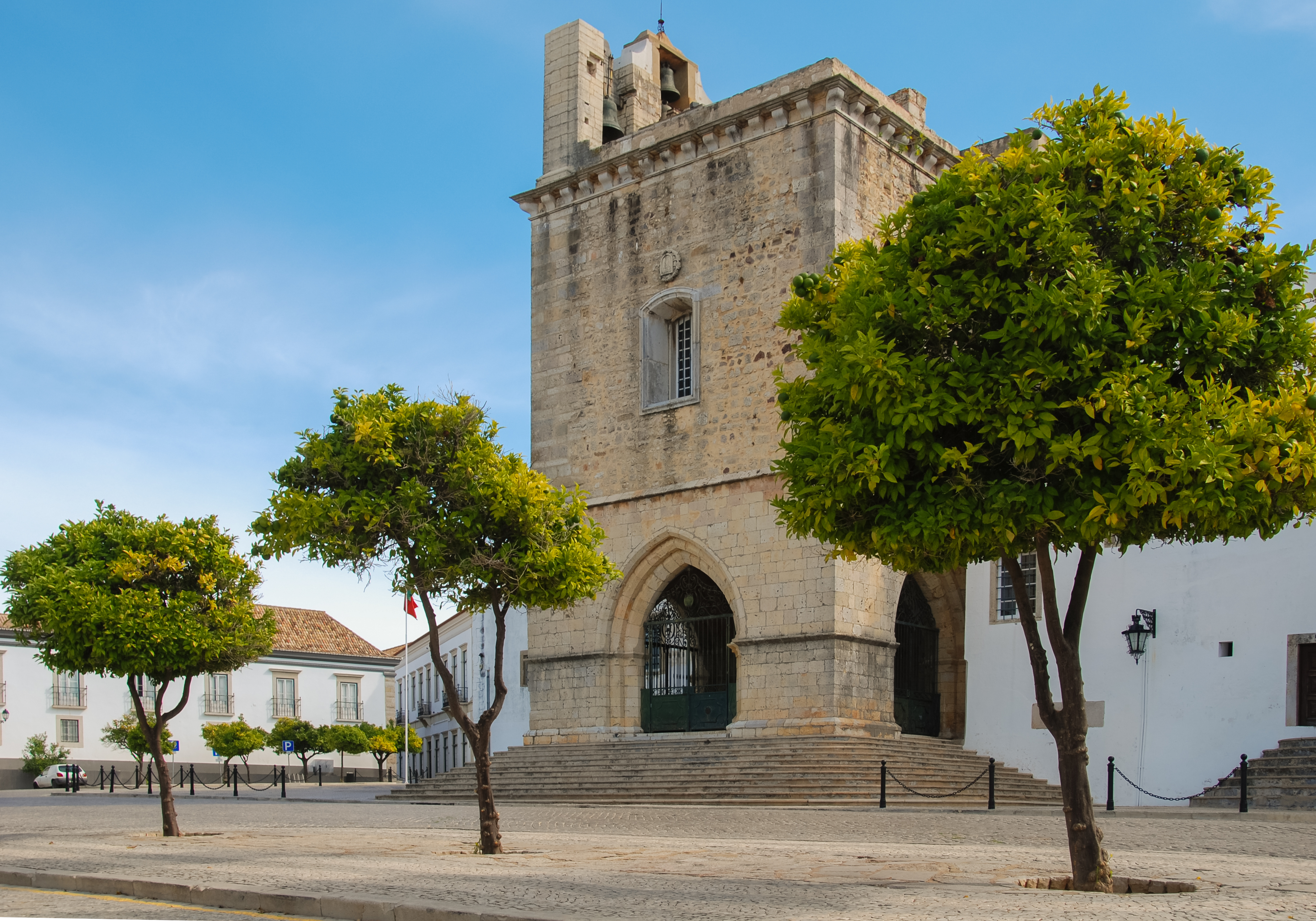
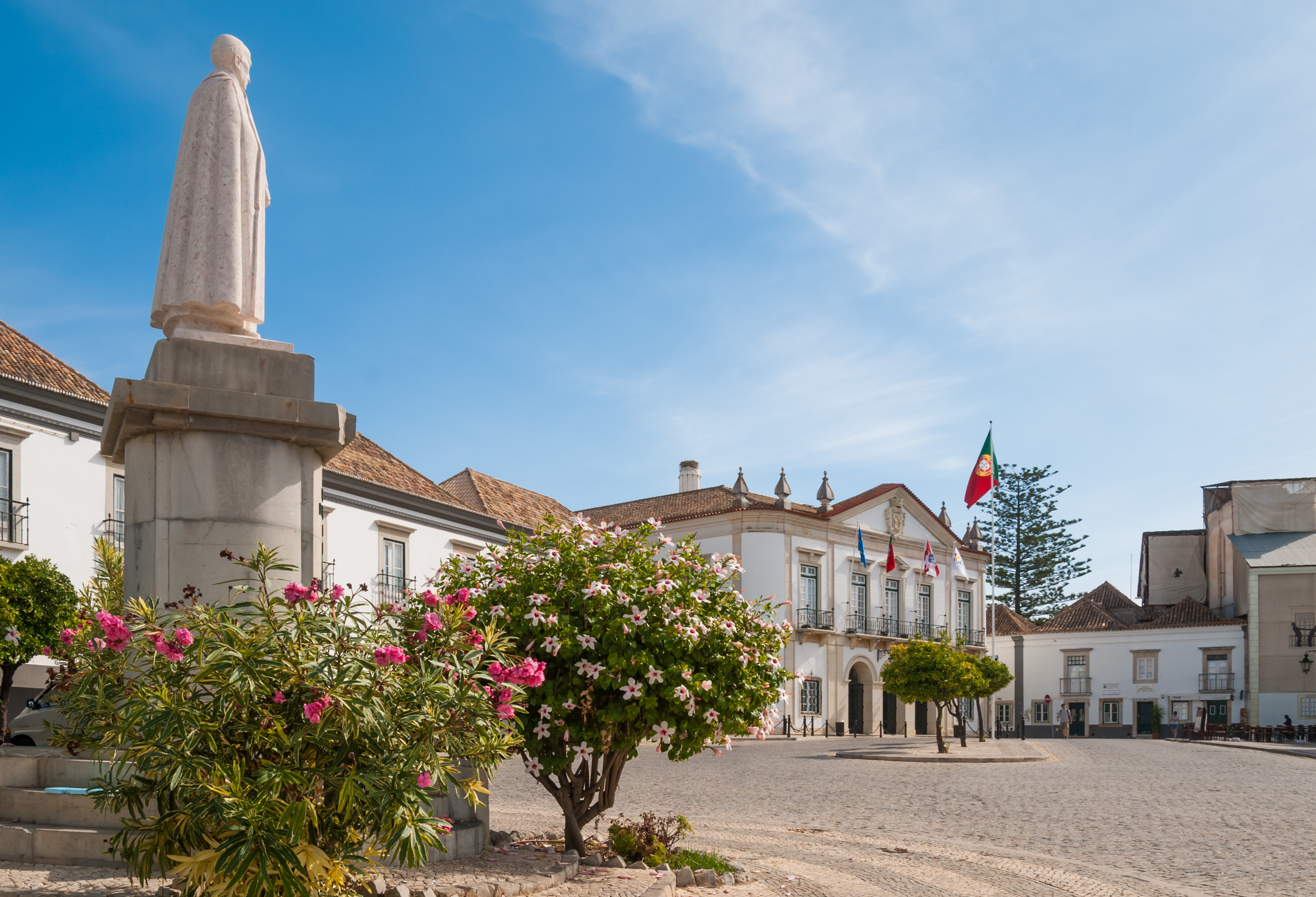
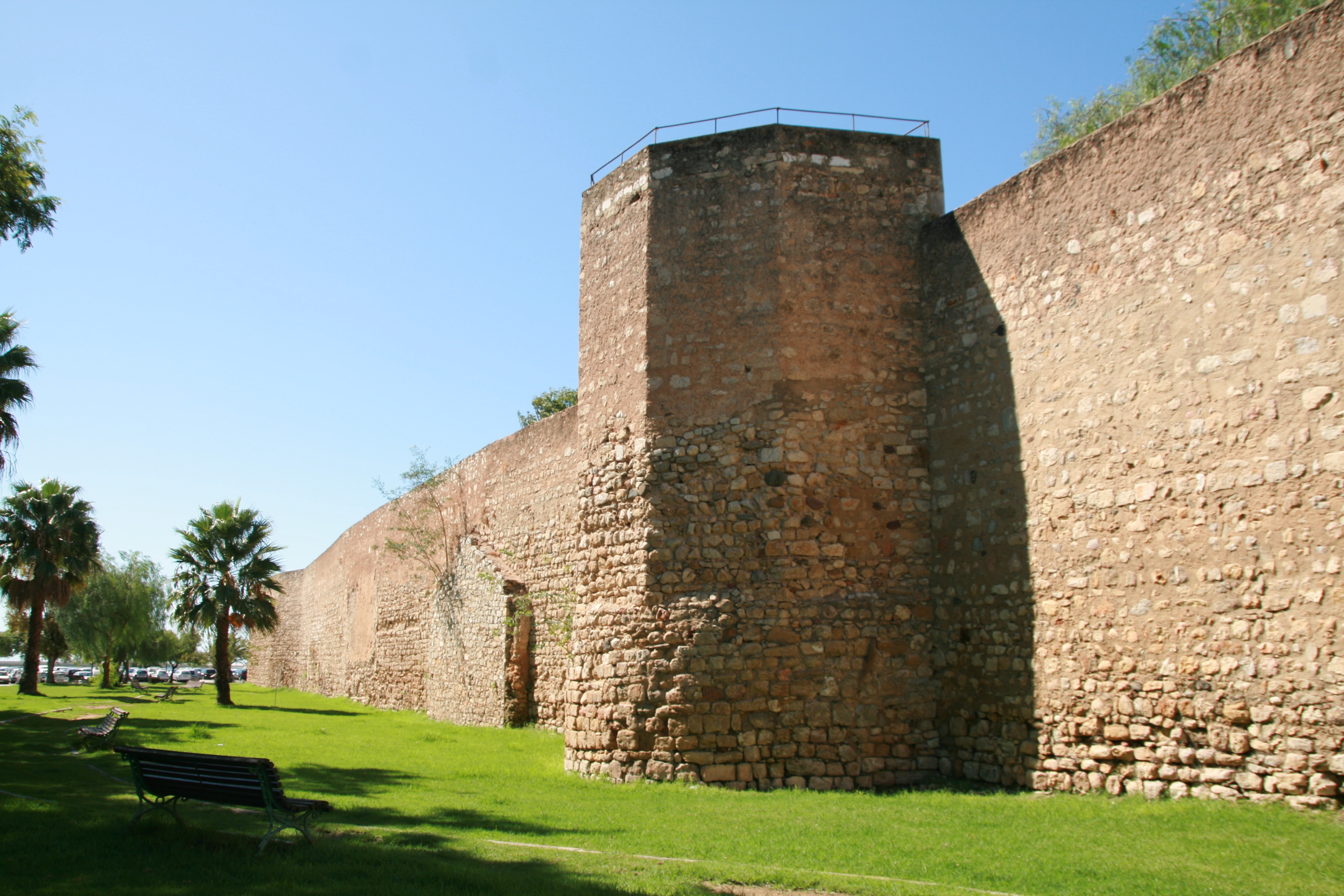
- Aerial view of Faro Estoi Palace Faro Cathedral City Hall City walls

- Flag Coat of arms
- Interactive map of Faro
- Location within Portugal Location within Europe
- Coordinates: 37°00′58″N 07°56′06″W
- Country: Portugal
- Region: Algarve
- District: Faro
- Intermunicipal community: Algarve
- Settlement: c. 400 BCE
- Roman Ossonoba: c. 206 a.C
- Administrative Capital of Algarve: 1756
- Civil parishes: 5

Government
  - Type: Local administrative unit
  - Body: Concelho/Câmara Municipal
  - Mayor: António Pina (PS)

Area
  - Municipality: 202.57 km^{2} (78.21 sq mi)

Population (2024)
  - Municipality: ▲70,347
  - Metro (Total CIM): ▲191,563
- Postal code: 8000
- Municipal holiday: 7 September
- Website: Official website

Faro, (Note: /ˈfɑːroʊ/ FAR-oh, Portuguese: [ˈfaɾu]) officially the City of Faro, (Note: Portuguese: Cidade de Faro) is a city and a municipality in southern Portugal. It is the capital of both the Algarve region and the Faro District, as well as the southernmost city on the Portuguese mainland. Faro municipality covers an area of 202.57 km^{2} (78.21 sq mi) and, as of 2024, had 80,316 inhabitants, making it the second most populous municipality in the Faro District (Algarve region) after Loulé.

The district has a total population of 492,747 residents (2024). Faro lies on the shore of the Ria Formosa lagoon, a protected nature reserve, and houses the region’s international airport and university.

Founded as Ossonoba, Faro was a settlement during the Phoenician and Roman periods and later served as a Moorish port known as Santa Maria Ibn Harun. It was conquered and absorbed into the Kingdom of Portugal in 1249, and later granted city status in 1540. Since 1756, following the devastation of the Lisbon earthquake, it has been the administrative capital of the Algarve.

Owing to their proximity, shared infrastructure, and commuter links, the municipalities of Faro, Olhão and Loulé may be considered an intermunicipal community with a population of 191,563 inhabitants as of 2024. A bus rapid transit system is under development to further connect these municipalities.

== History ==
Timeline of Faro
Historical affiliations

Roman Empire AD 206–411
Alans 411–560
Byzantine Empire 560–624
Visigothic Kingdom 624-711
Umayyad Caliphate 711-756
Emirate of Córdoba 756-929
Caliphate of Córdoba 929-1018
Taifa of Santa Maria do Algarve 1018-1051
Taifa of Seville 1051-1091
Almoravid dynasty 1091-1145
Taifa of Badajoz 1145-1155
Almohad Caliphate 1155-1249
Kingdom of Portugal 1249-1580
Iberian Union 1580-1640
Kingdom of Portugal 1640-1910
Portugal 1910-present

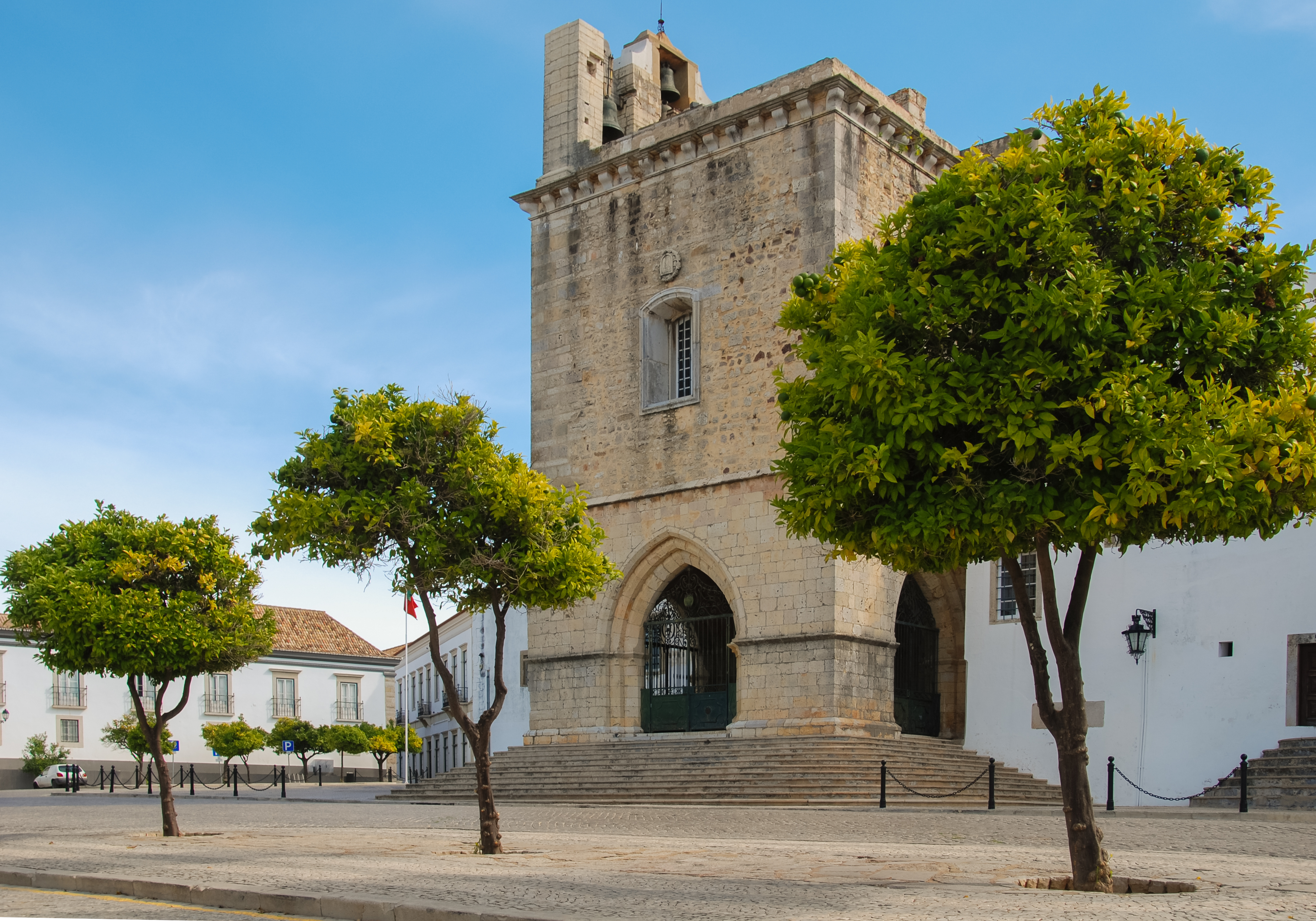
The medieval cathedral of Faro

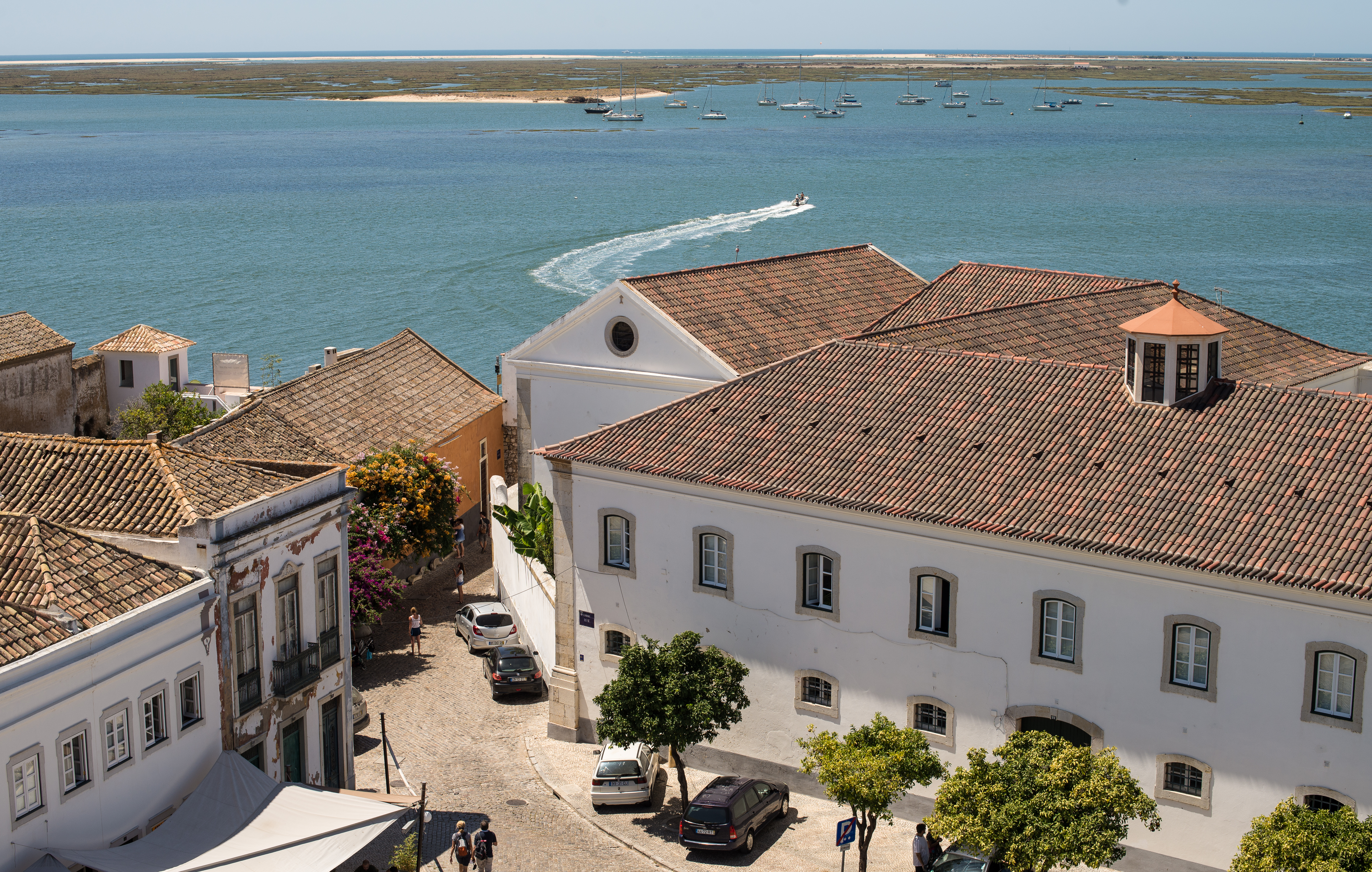
Ria Formosa view from Faro

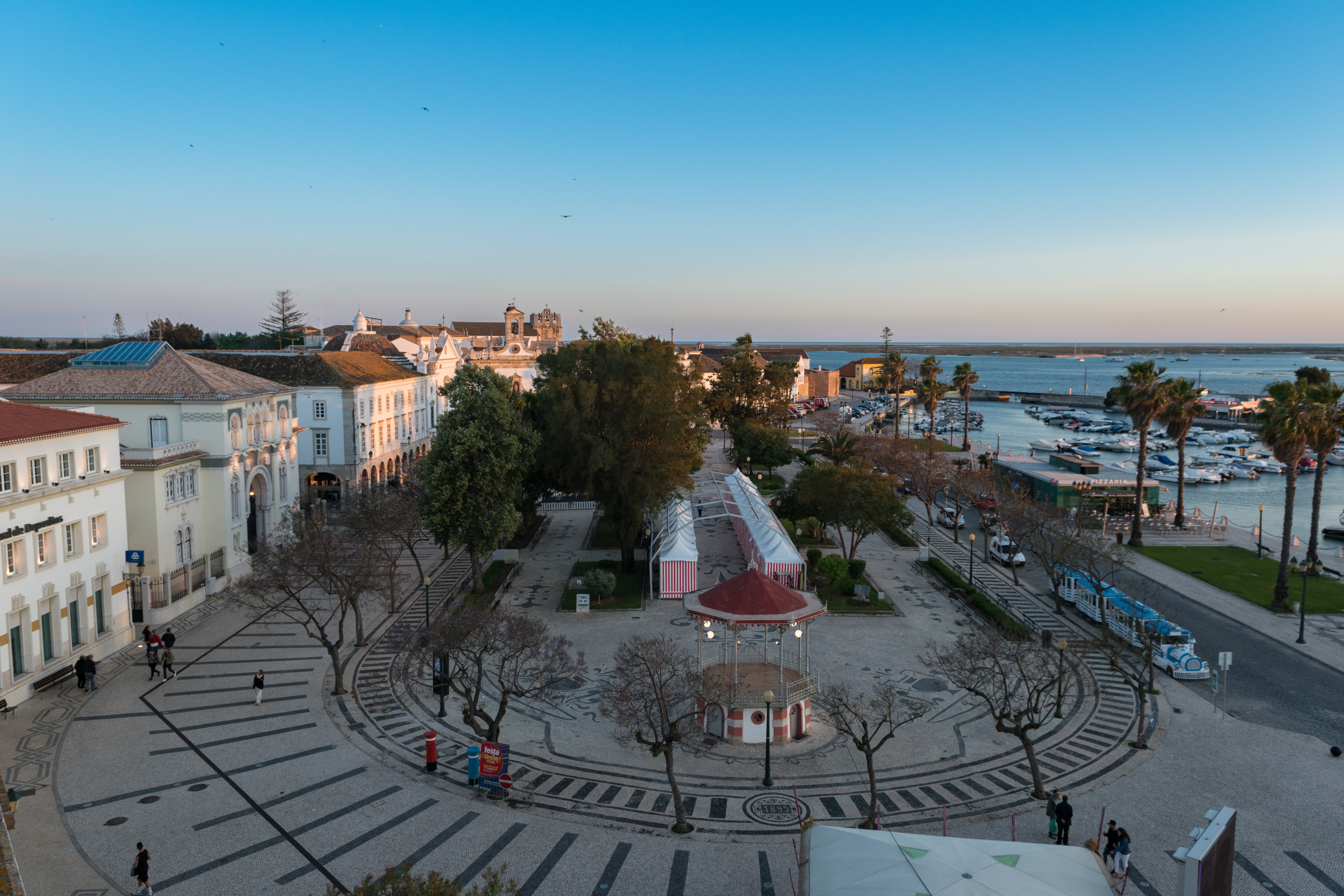
The Manuel Bívar park, the main square and historic centre of Faro

The Ria Formosa lagoon attracted humans from the Palaeolithic age until the end of prehistory. The first settlements date from the fourth century BC, during the period of Phoenician colonization of the western Mediterranean. At the time, the area was known as Ossonoba, and was the most important urban centre of southern Portugal and commercial port for agricultural products, fish, and minerals.

Between the second and eighth centuries, the city was under the domain of the Romans, then the Byzantines, and later Visigoths, before being conquered by the Arabic-speaking Muslims known as Moors in 713. From the third century onwards and during the Visigothic period, it was the site of an Episcopal see, the Ancient Diocese of Ossonoba (306-688). The Byzantine presence has endured in the towers of the city walls that were built during the Byzantine period.

With the advent of Moorish rule in the eighth century, Ossonoba retained its status as the most important town in the southwest corner of the Iberian Peninsula. In the 9th century, after a revolt led by Yahia Ben Bakr who was succeeded in office by his son, Bakr Ben Yahia, it became the capital of a short-lived princedom and was fortified with a ring of defensive walls. At this time, in the 10th century, the name Santa Maria began to be used instead of Ossonoba. By the 11th century, the town was known as Santa Maria Ibn Harun.

During the Second Crusade soon after the Anglo-Norman forces took Lisbon in 1147 a detachment of this group besieged Faro, which was still by then under Muslim rule, on their way to the Holy Land. Again in 1217, during the Fifth Crusade, a Frisian fleet of crusaders on their way to Acre, sacked and burned the city.

During the 500 years of Moorish rule, some Jewish residents of Faro made written copies of the Old Testament. The Moors were defeated and expelled in 1249 by the forces of the Portuguese King Afonso III. With the decline of the importance of the city of Silves (which was made the regional bishopric as Diocese of Silves shortly during and properly after the Reconquista), Faro took over the role of administration of the Algarve area.

=== Portuguese Kingdom ===
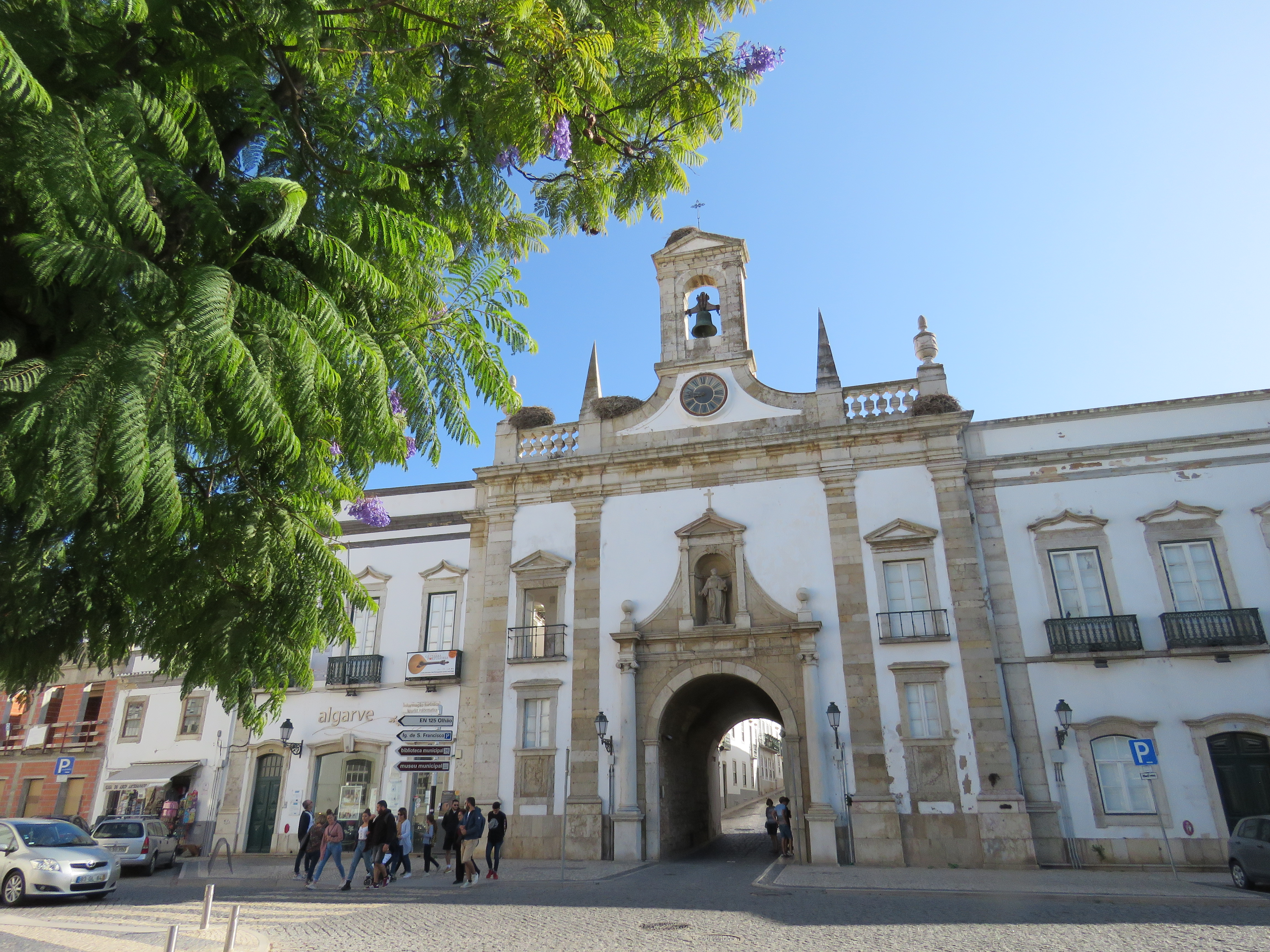
Former district civil government's palace

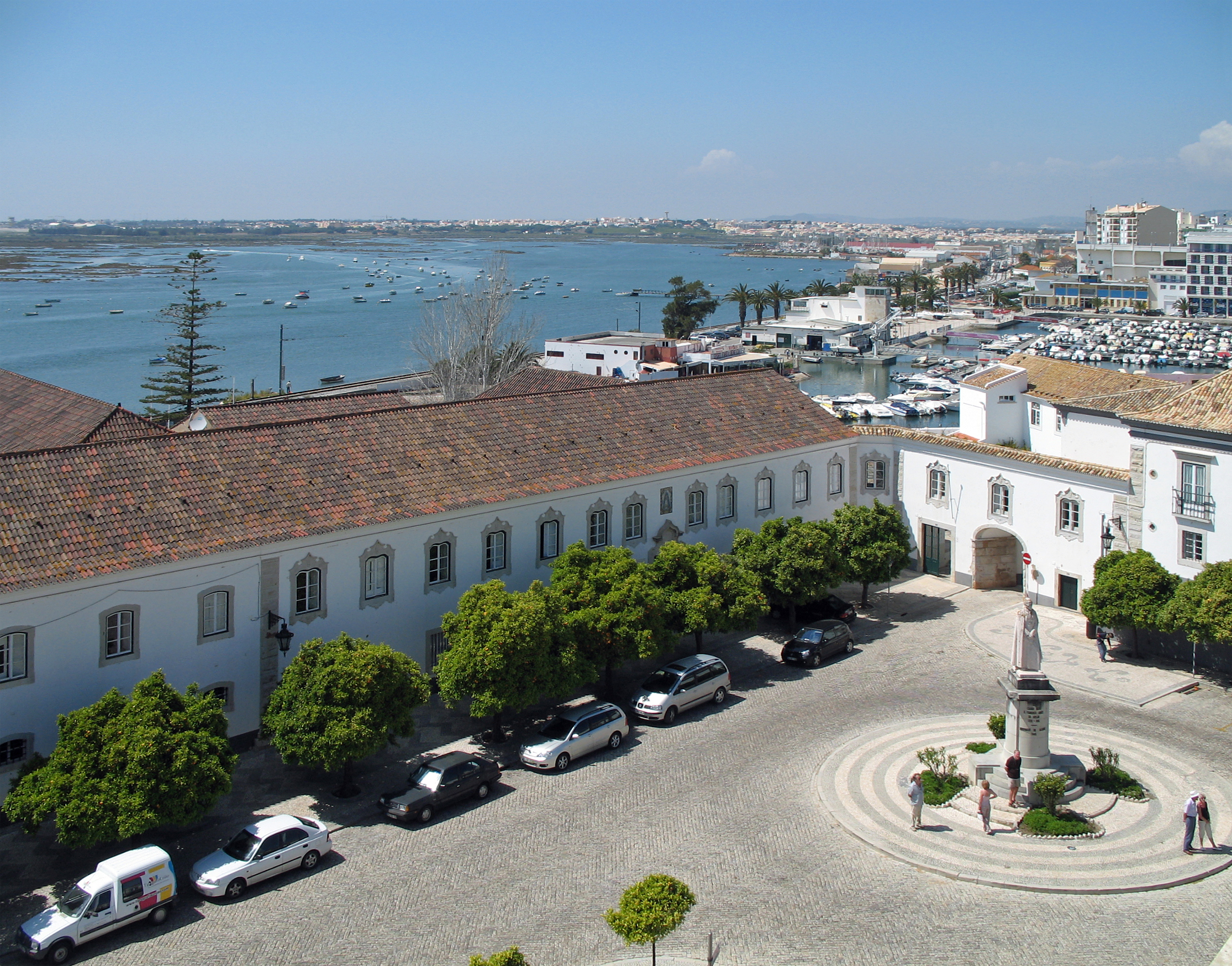
View of Faro from its cathedral

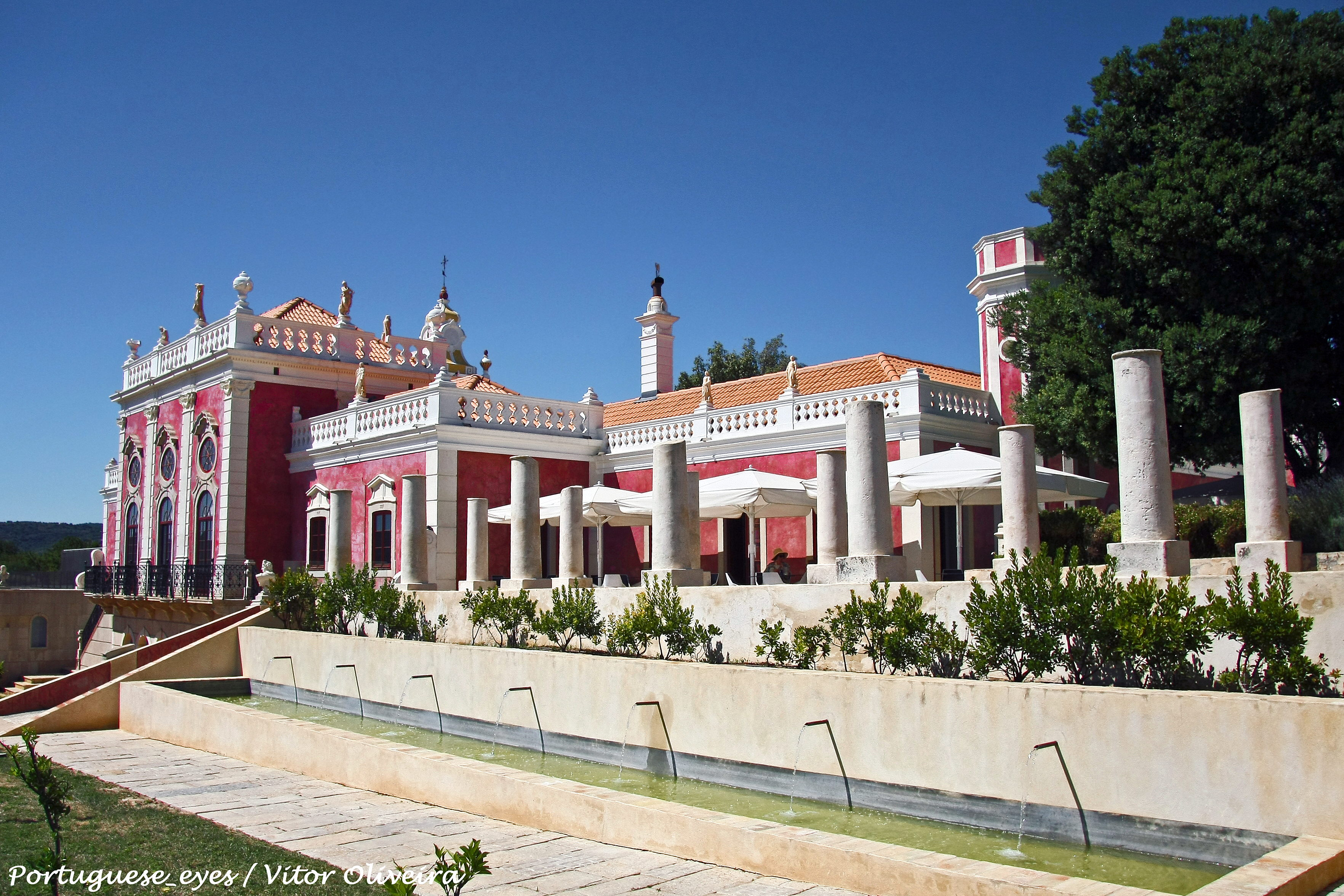
Estói Palace with its mixture of Renaissance and Baroque styles

After Portuguese independence in 1143, Afonso Henriques and his successors began an expansion and Christian repopulation into the southern Iberian territory which had previously been occupied by the Moors. Following the conquest by D. Afonso III, in 1249, the Portuguese referred to the town as Santa Maria de Faaron or Santa Maria de Faaram. In the following years, the town became prosperous, due to its secure port and exploitation of salt. Consequently, by the beginning of the Portuguese Age of Discovery, the town was well positioned to become a leading commercial centre.

In the 14th century, the Jewish community began to grow in importance. In 1487, Samuel Gacon began printing the Pentateuco in Hebrew, the first book printed in Portugal. The Jewish community of Faro had long been a dominant force in the region, with many artisans and merchants contributing heavily to the economy and city development, but this level of prosperity was interrupted in December 1496 by an edict of Manuel I of Portugal, expelling those who did not convert to Christianity. As a result, officially, Jews no longer remained in Portugal. In the place of the Jewish village of Vila Adentro, the convent of Nossa Senhora da Assunção was founded and patronised by Queen Leonor, wife of the king.

Manuel I promoted the development and expansion of the city; 1499 had the construction of a hospital, the Church of Espírito Santo (or Church of the Misericórdia), a customshouse, and a slaughterhouse, all near the shoreline.

By 1540, John III of Portugal had elevated Faro to the status of city, then in 1577, the bishopric of the Algarve was transferred from Silves, which retains a co-cathedral, to the present Diocese of Faro.

In 1597, the city was sacked by English privateers led by Robert Devereux, 2nd Earl of Essex. The resultant fires damaged the walls, churches, and other buildings. At the same time, English troops seized the library of the Bishop of Faro, then Fernando Martins de Mascarenhas, which eventually became part of the collection of the University of Oxford's Bodleian Library. Among the looted books was the first printed book in Portugal: a Torah in local Hebrew (Judeo-Español), printed by Samuel Gacon at his workshop in Faro.

Throughout the 17th and 18th centuries, the city was expanded, with a series of walls during the period of the Restoration Wars (1640–1668), encompassing the semicircular front to the Ria Formosa.

The western city of Lagos had become the capital of the historical province of Algarve in 1577, but this all changed with the 1755 Lisbon earthquake. It affected many settlements across the Algarve, including Faro, which suffered damage to churches, convents (specifically the Convent of São Francisco and Convent of Santa Clara), and the episcopal palace, in addition to the walls, castle towers and bulwarks, barracks, guardhouses, warehouses, customshouses, and prison.

Much of the greater devastation across the coastal and lowland regions was caused by a tsunami, which dismantled fortresses and razed homes. Almost all the coastal towns and villages of the Algarve were heavily damaged by the tsunami, except Faro, protected by the sandy banks of the Ria Formosa lagoon. With the capital Lagos devastated, Faro became the administrative seat of the region the following year, 1756.

== Geography ==
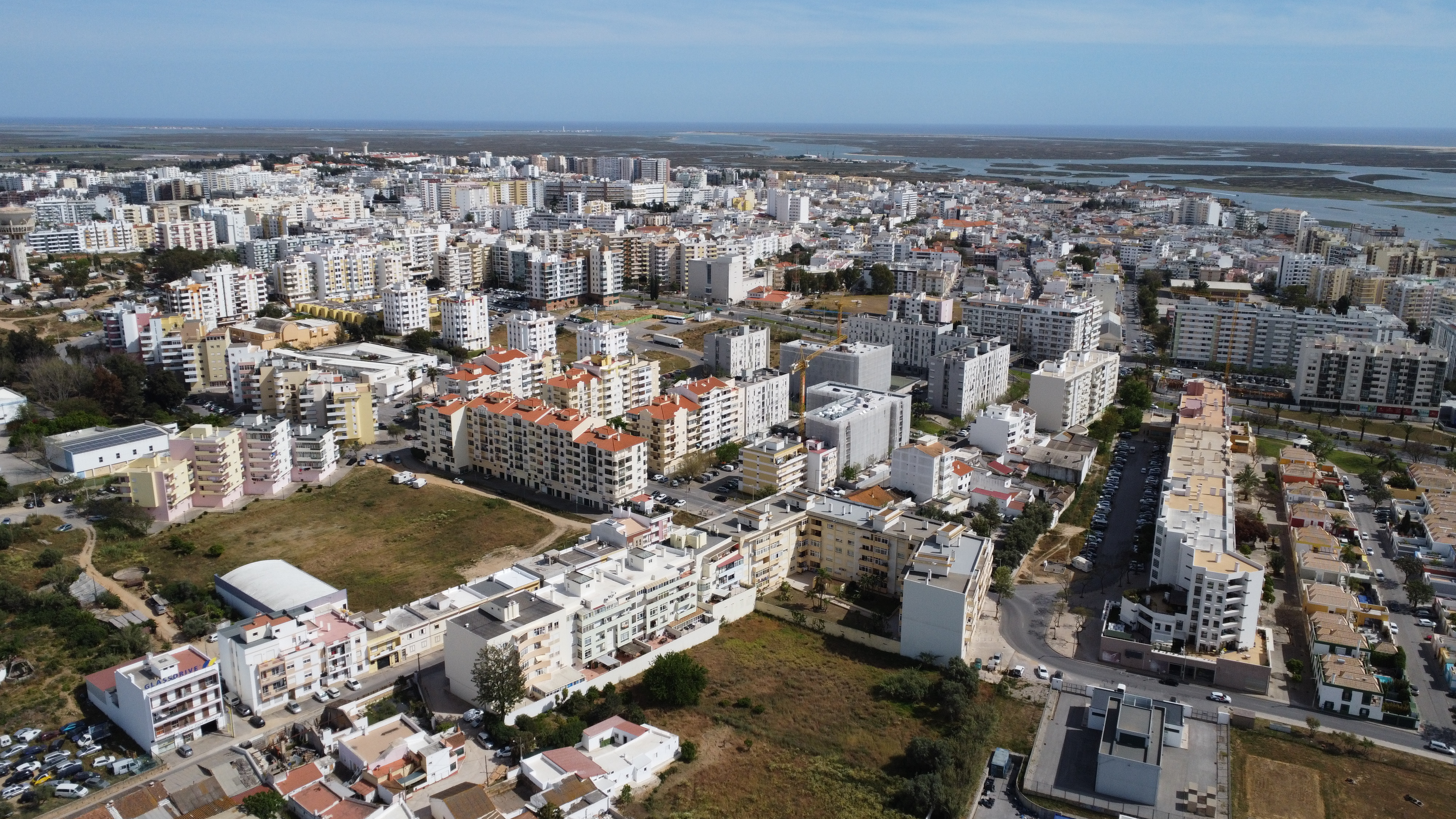
Aerial view of Faro, in 2023

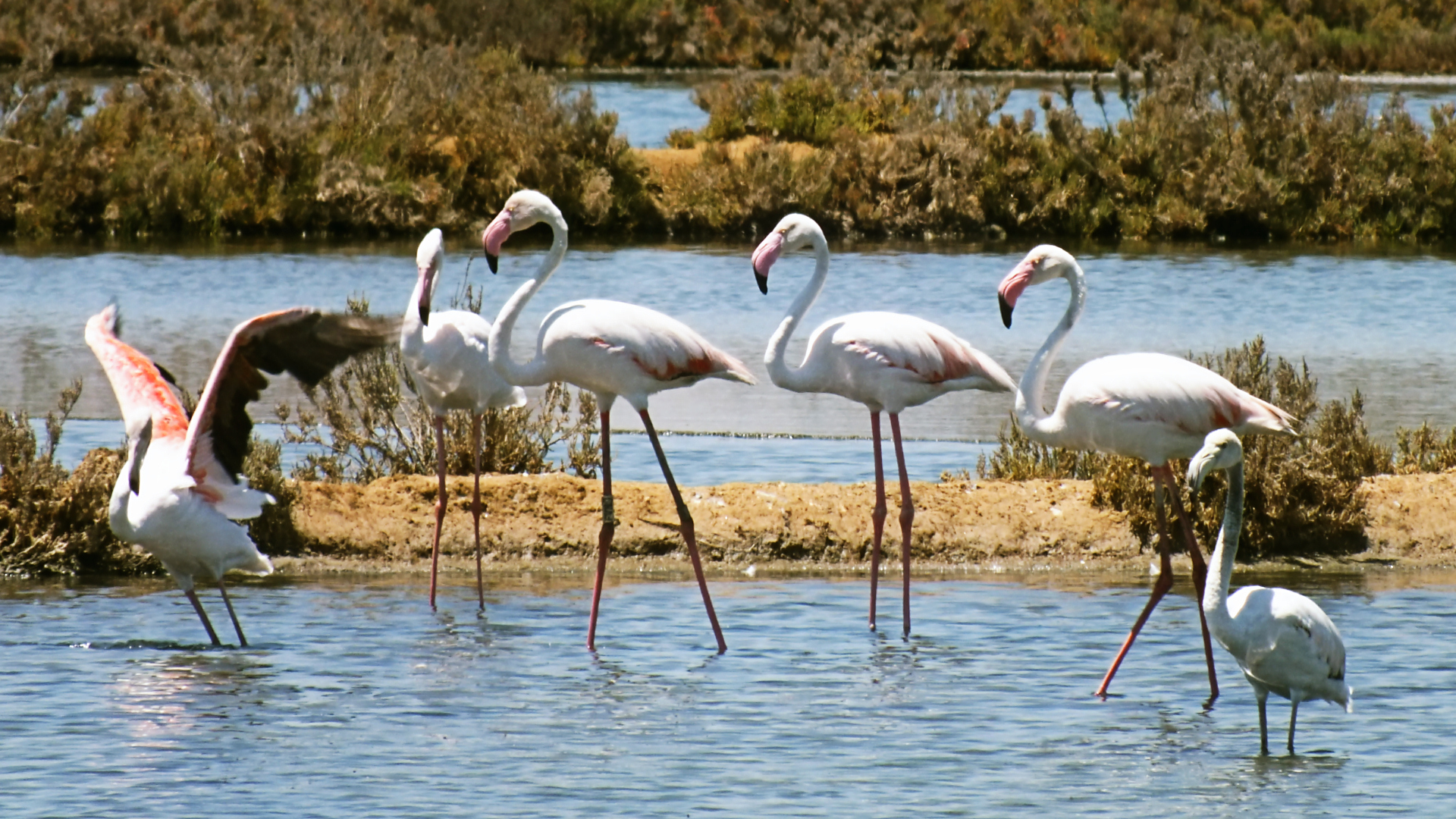
Flamingos on Ria Formosa

The municipality of Faro is divided into two distinct areas, the coastline, part of the Nature Park of Ria Formosa and the barrocal, characterized by hills and valleys, populated with typical Algarvian vegetation. The coastal area includes the Praia de Faro community on the Ancão Peninsula and the Barreta and Culatra islands.

The nature park was created by Decree-Law 373/87, on 8 December 1987, and is considered one of the seven natural wonders of Portugal, with a beach that is around 7 km (4 mi) from the downtown. It includes the river and a lagoon system, interspersed with dunes, forming a small islands and peninsulas, that protect a large area of marshes, channels, and islets. The beaches in Faro are situated on the peninsula of Ancão and island of Culatra, along the corridor of the nature park. The park is a rich and complex aquatic ecosystem, consisting of barrier islands, marshes, and channels, comprising sandy shorelines that separate the waters of the Ria Formosa and Atlantic Ocean.

The beaches of Faro and Barrinha/Barra de São Luís, are located on the Ancão peninsula, the beach of Barreta on the Ilha Deserta, and the beaches of Farol and Culatra are located on the Ilha Culatra. The barrier islands are separated by tidal flats and shallows, including (from west to east) the Barra do Ancão/Barra de São Luís, the Barra de Santa Maria/Barra do Farol, and the Barra da Culatra/Barra da Armona (in the municipality of Olhão).

Annually, many species of aquatic migratory birds transient northern Europe and nest there during the winter. These include flamingos, terns, pied avocets, Eurasian wigeons, and common chaffinches.

Within the town are gardens and open spaces, among which are the Manuel Bivar Garden, Alameda João de Deus Garden, and the Mata do Liceu.

A place of interest is the Capela dos Ossos, an ossuary chapel in Faro which belongs to the 18th-century Carmelite church, Nossa Senhora do Carmo.

The variety of species and natural conditions result in the region being a popular ecotourism zone, promoting birdwatching, boating trips into the delta, kayaking along the Ria Formosa, pedestrian trails, and biking tours, accompanied by nature guides. The municipality is crossed by the southern Ecovia do Algarve, a bicycling circuit that connects the Algarve to the rest of Europe.

=== Climate ===
Faro has a Mediterranean climate (Köppen: Csa), moderated by a transitioning Portugal-Canary current giving a certain resemblance to Southern California that is not heated in the summer by the Mediterranean Sea like Algarve. Given this region is highly susceptible to the difference of precipitation throughout the seasons of the year, in the future scarcity of water could appear in conjunction with the increase of temperature and less incidence of rains.

Summers are warm to hot and sunny with average daytime maximum temperatures of 27–35 °C (81–95 °F). Summer warmth can linger well into October. The weather in the winter is generally mild by European standards, managing around 6 hours of sunshine each day, with temperatures averaging around 8–16 °C (46–61 °F) in the coldest month. The city receives most of its rainfall over the winter; rain is scarce between June and September. The annual average temperature is around 17.5 to 18.5 °C (63.5 to 65.3 °F), however it is becoming hotter and hotter, reaching as high as 19.3 °C (66.7 °F) in 2023, with average temperatures since 2010 or even since 1994 being around 18–19 °C (64–66 °F), and the annual rainfall is around 500 millimetres (19.69 in), however in recent years, rainfall has diminished, even reaching as low as 178.6 millimetres or 7.03 inches in 2019, with the average yearly rainfall from 2017 to 2021 being closer to 350 millimetres or 14 inches. The average sea temperature is 16–17 °C (61–63 °F) in January rising to 22–24 °C (72–75 °F) in August and September. Higher sea water temperatures are reached if the weather patterns produce a significant outflow of warmer surface water out of the Mediterranean which bathe the coastal Algarve with much warmer water. During the summer months, tropical nights are common and, on average, Faro has 45 tropical nights per year, which is the highest in Portugal. Faro has the highest minimum temperature ever recorded in Portugal, which was 32 °C (90 °F) on 26 July 2004.

With over 3000 hours of sunshine a year, Faro is often regarded as one of the sunniest cities in Europe, alongside nearby Tavira. July and August have the most sunshine, while December has the least.

Climate data for Faro (FAO), 1991-2020 normals, extremes 1981–present, sun hours 1971-1995
Month	Jan	Feb	Mar	Apr	May	Jun	Jul	Aug	Sep	Oct	Nov	Dec	Year
Record high °C (°F)	21.9 (71.4)	22.9 (73.2)	28.9 (84.0)	30.1 (86.2)	37.1 (98.8)	37.5 (99.5)	44.3 (111.7)	39.6 (103.3)	35.2 (95.4)	35.6 (96.1)	28.6 (83.5)	23.1 (73.6)	44.3 (111.7)
Mean daily maximum °C (°F)	16.3 (61.3)	17.0 (62.6)	18.9 (66.0)	20.7 (69.3)	23.5 (74.3)	26.8 (80.2)	29.4 (84.9)	29.2 (84.6)	26.4 (79.5)	23.3 (73.9)	19.6 (67.3)	17.1 (62.8)	22.3 (72.1)
Daily mean °C (°F)	12.3 (54.1)	12.9 (55.2)	14.9 (58.8)	16.6 (61.9)	19.3 (66.7)	22.3 (72.1)	24.5 (76.1)	24.6 (76.3)	22.4 (72.3)	19.6 (67.3)	15.7 (60.3)	13.4 (56.1)	18.2 (64.8)
Mean daily minimum °C (°F)	8.3 (46.9)	8.8 (47.8)	10.8 (51.4)	12.4 (54.3)	15.0 (59.0)	17.8 (64.0)	19.6 (67.3)	19.9 (67.8)	18.3 (64.9)	15.8 (60.4)	11.9 (53.4)	9.7 (49.5)	14.0 (57.2)
Record low °C (°F)	0.2 (32.4)	−0.3 (31.5)	2.3 (36.1)	4.8 (40.6)	6.7 (44.1)	11.4 (52.5)	13.6 (56.5)	14.4 (57.9)	9.9 (49.8)	7.8 (46.0)	3.0 (37.4)	1.2 (34.2)	−0.3 (31.5)
Average precipitation mm (inches)	49.3 (1.94)	41.9 (1.65)	46.8 (1.84)	39.0 (1.54)	26.2 (1.03)	5.1 (0.20)	0.9 (0.04)	3.0 (0.12)	21.5 (0.85)	56.0 (2.20)	75.5 (2.97)	90.0 (3.54)	455.1 (17.92)
Average precipitation days (≥ 1.0 mm)	6.0	5.4	5.6	5.3	3.8	0.8	0.2	0.2	1.9	6.0	6.6	7.0	48.9
Mean monthly sunshine hours	182.1	172.0	242.6	253.6	305.0	326.9	360.6	344.9	279.1	227.0	191.6	159.0	3,044.4
Source: IPMA

Climate data for Faro (FAO), elevation: 8 m or 26 ft, 1961-1990 normals and extremes
Month	Jan	Feb	Mar	Apr	May	Jun	Jul	Aug	Sep	Oct	Nov	Dec	Year
Record high °C (°F)	22.4 (72.3)	25.6 (78.1)	27.4 (81.3)	28.3 (82.9)	33.8 (92.8)	36.7 (98.1)	39.8 (103.6)	39.4 (102.9)	37.4 (99.3)	33.3 (91.9)	28.8 (83.8)	25.4 (77.7)	39.8 (103.6)
Mean daily maximum °C (°F)	16.1 (61.0)	16.7 (62.1)	18.4 (65.1)	19.8 (67.6)	22.4 (72.3)	25.4 (77.7)	28.7 (83.7)	28.8 (83.8)	26.7 (80.1)	23.1 (73.6)	19.4 (66.9)	16.7 (62.1)	21.8 (71.3)
Daily mean °C (°F)	11.9 (53.4)	12.6 (54.7)	13.7 (56.7)	15.1 (59.2)	17.5 (63.5)	20.6 (69.1)	23.3 (73.9)	23.4 (74.1)	21.8 (71.2)	18.7 (65.7)	15.1 (59.2)	12.7 (54.9)	17.2 (63.0)
Mean daily minimum °C (°F)	7.7 (45.9)	8.4 (47.1)	8.9 (48.0)	10.4 (50.7)	12.5 (54.5)	15.7 (60.3)	17.9 (64.2)	18.0 (64.4)	16.9 (62.4)	14.3 (57.7)	10.9 (51.6)	8.6 (47.5)	12.5 (54.5)
Record low °C (°F)	−1.2 (29.8)	−1.2 (29.8)	1.8 (35.2)	3.6 (38.5)	5.6 (42.1)	7.4 (45.3)	10.5 (50.9)	11.6 (52.9)	10.2 (50.4)	6.0 (42.8)	2.2 (36.0)	−1.4 (29.5)	−1.4 (29.5)
Average precipitation mm (inches)	78 (3.1)	72 (2.8)	39 (1.5)	38 (1.5)	21 (0.8)	8 (0.3)	1 (0.0)	4 (0.2)	14 (0.6)	67 (2.6)	86 (3.4)	94 (3.7)	522 (20.5)
Average precipitation days (≥ 1 mm)	8	9	5	6	3	1	trace	1	2	6	7	8	56
Average relative humidity (%)	77	77	71	68	64	65	60	60	65	71	75	77	69
Mean monthly sunshine hours	172	165	234	251	314	332	368	352	273	226	182	167	3,036
Source: NOAA

=== Human geography ===
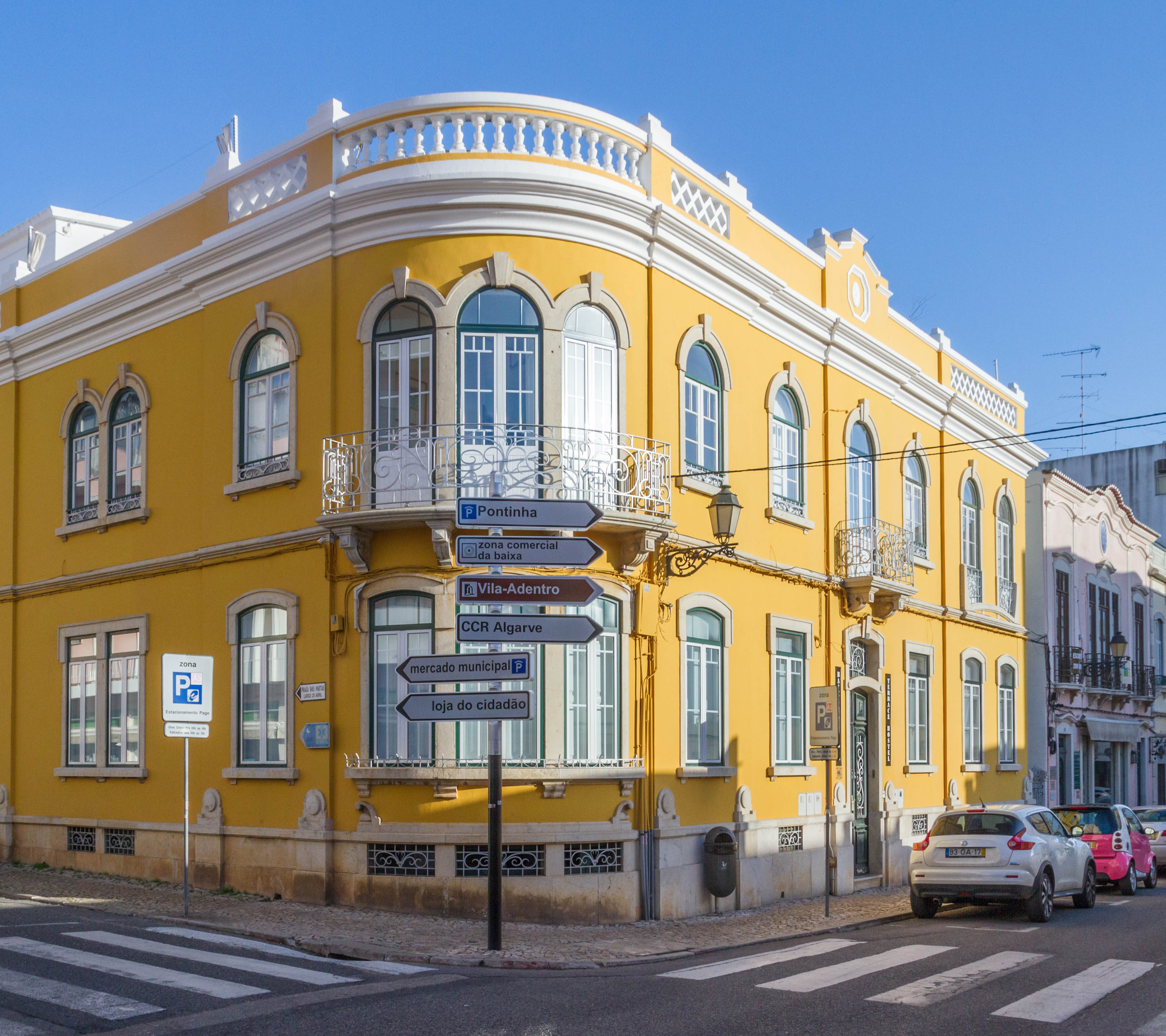
Town center of Faro

Administratively, the municipality is divided into five civil parishes (freguesias):

- Faro (Sé e São Pedro)
- Conceição
- Estoi
- Montenegro
- Santa Bárbara de Nexe

== Twin towns and sister cities ==
Faro is twinned with:

- Bolama, Guinea-Bissau
- Haikou, China
- Hayward, United States
- Huelva, Spain
- Maxixe, Mozambique
- Praia, Cape Verde
- Príncipe, São Tomé and Príncipe
- Tangier, Morocco

== Transport ==
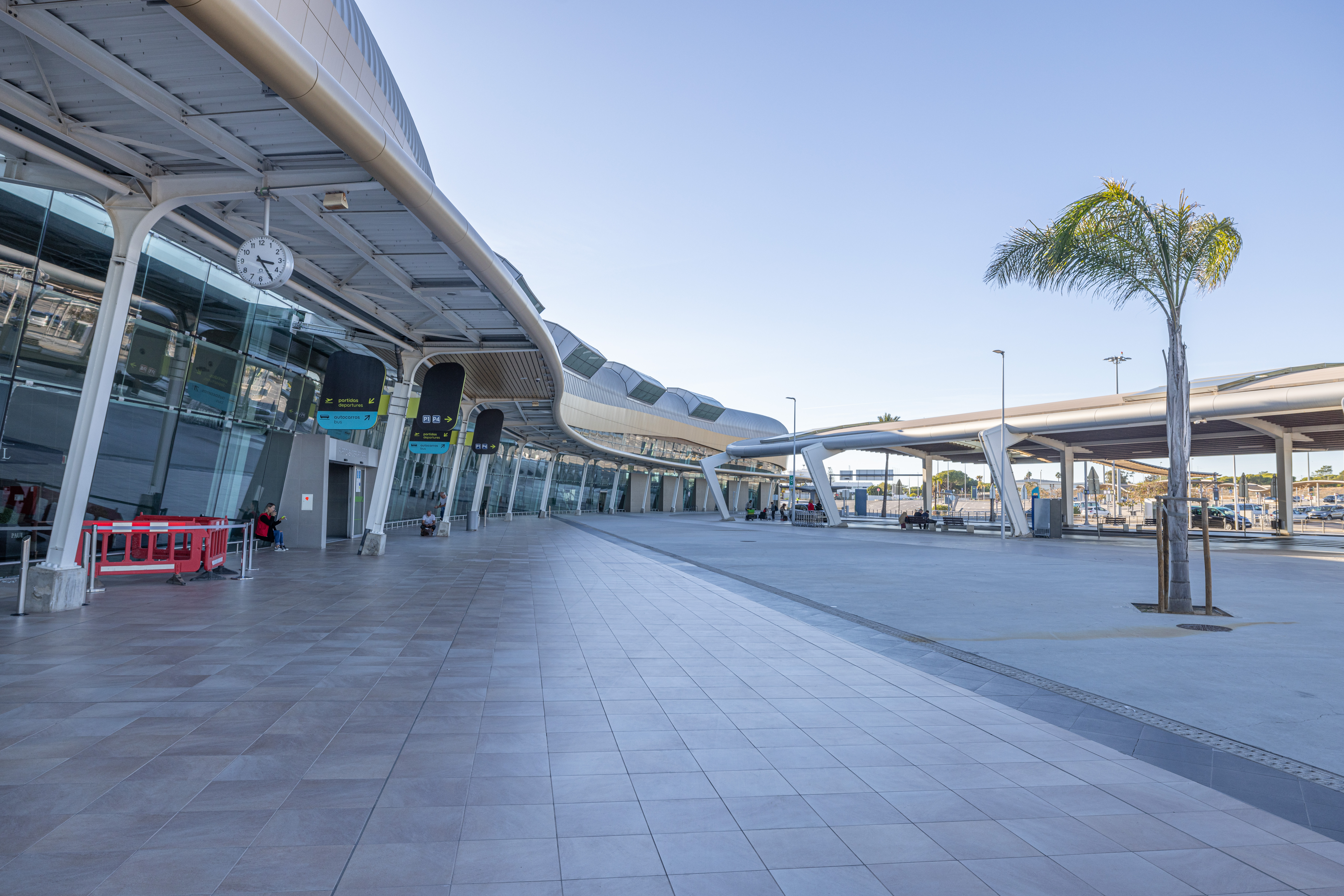
The terminal of Faro International Airport

Faro is served by a transport network connecting it to the Algarve, and by extension, other international markets. Faro is about 3 hours and 30 minutes by air from the principal European destinations. By car, it is about 2 hours and 30 minutes from Lisbon, along the A2, and less than 1 hour from Andalusia, along the A22.

=== Airport ===
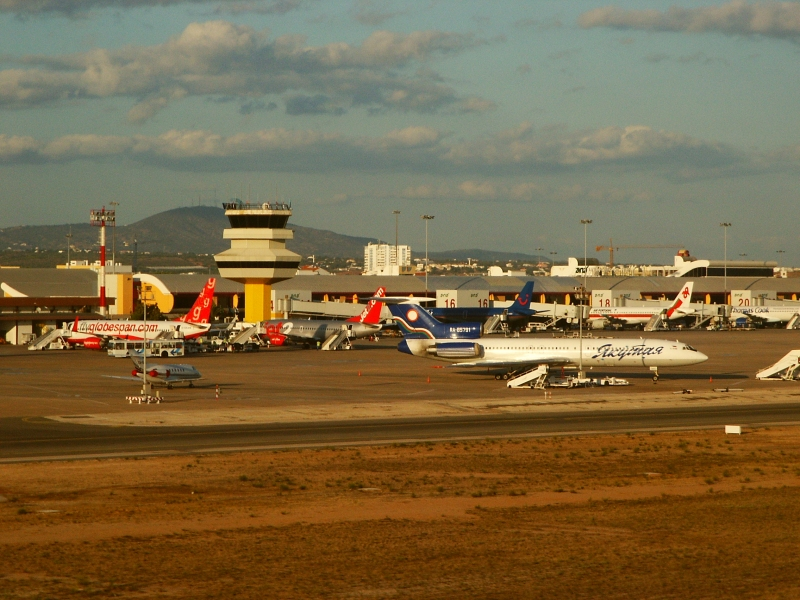
Faro International Airport

Faro international Airport managed, as of 2025, more than 10 million passengers, with 45 airlines serving this airport, including many low-cost airlines, with regional, european and long haul flights (Canada and USA). In recent years, the number of visitors travelling through the airport has increased as more and more airlines compete to offer cheap flights to the Algarve. The transport facilities to and from Faro airport and the centre of Faro include taxicabs and a bus line.

=== Railway ===
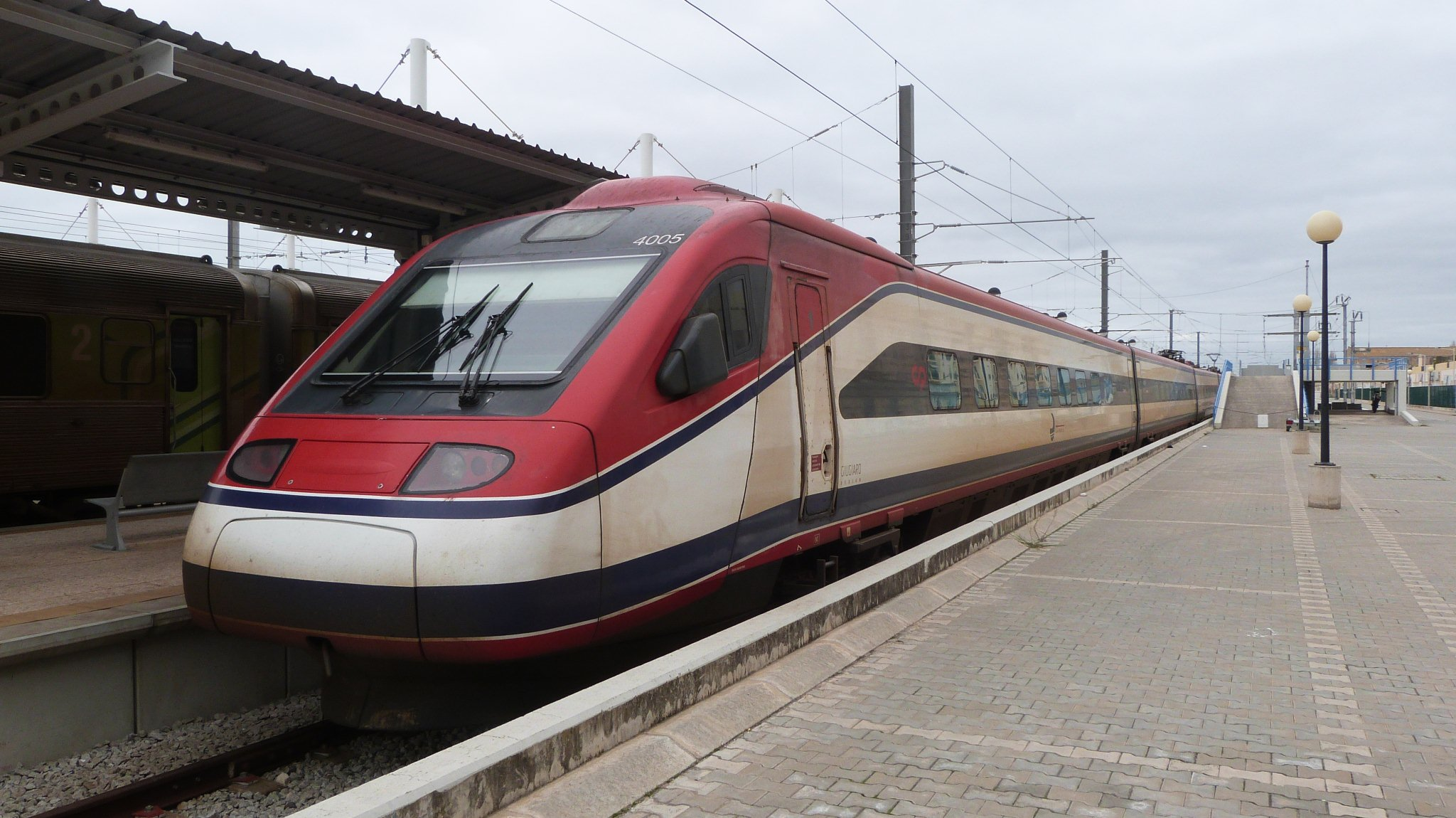
An Alfa Pendular train at Faro railway station

Faro is served by the centrally located Faro railway station, and a smaller halt in the east of the city at Bom João. The main station is operated by the national railway operator Comboios de Portugal (CP), which operates the Alfa Pendular, Intercidades and CP Regional routes, as well as a special service during the summer, the InterRegional line.

The Alfa Pendular service connects Faro to the north of Portugal and terminates in Porto. The Intercidades and InterRegional services connect Faro to Lisbon. The CP Regional service operates across the east and west Algarve and connects Faro to Lagos in the west Algarve, and Vila Real de Santo António in the east Algarve. Bom João is only served by the CP Regional trains heading east. Despite the proximity of Seville, it is not connected by train.

=== Buses ===
Faro municipality has a public bus network operated by ViaFaro and Próximo. It connects the city of Faro with Faro Airport and with the municipality's various parishes. Regional and long distance bus services are provided by the intermunicipal network VAMUS and by Rede Expressos, Flixbus.

A bus rapid transit system, the Algarve Metrobus, is under development and is expected to connect the municipalities of Faro, Olhão, and Loulé. Its expected route spans 37.6 kilometres (23.4 mi) with 24 stops, linking areas such as Faro Airport, the two campuses of the University of Algarve and Parque das Cidades (Algarve Stadium). The system will use electric vehicles operating on dedicated lanes and it is expected to run every 12 minutes during rush hour. The project is part of the Algarve 2030 regional programme and a public consultation on the feasibility study concluded in March 2025.

=== Maritime ===
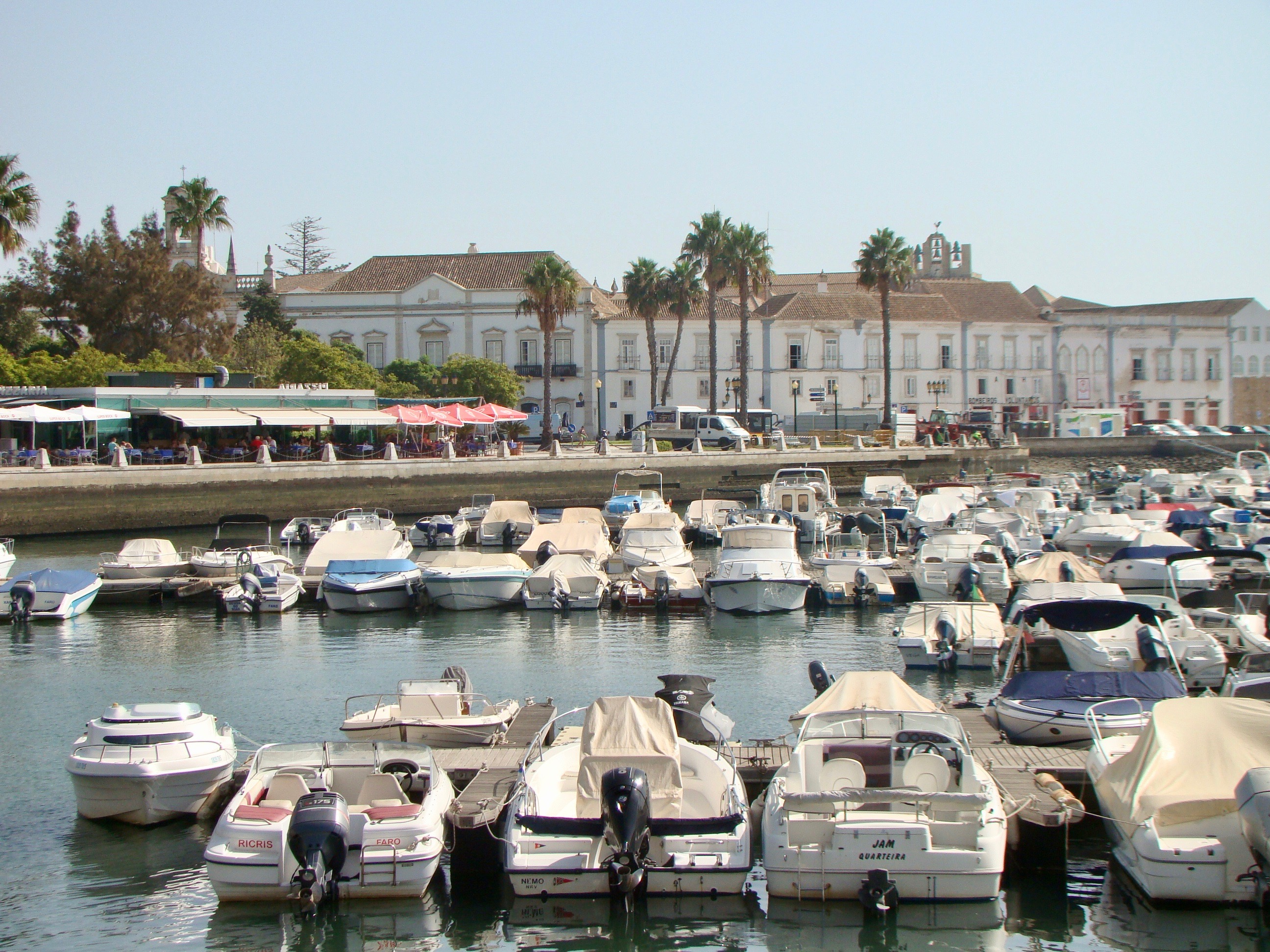
Faro Marina

Regular ferry and tourist boat services operate from Faro to the beaches and barrier islands along the Ria Formosa, departing either from the commercial wharf or the Portas do Mar wharf. These services connect to Praia de Faro, to Barreta Island and to Farol and Culatra on Culatra Island. While Praia de Faro is accessible by bridge, the remaining areas are only accessible by boat.

== Culture and entertainment ==
The Faro city holiday is on 7 September. The students' festival (Semana Académica da Universidade do Algarve), organized every year by students from the University of Algarve, is also an important event in Faro.

The Faro motorcycle club is responsible for one of the largest motorcycle events in Portugal and Europe.

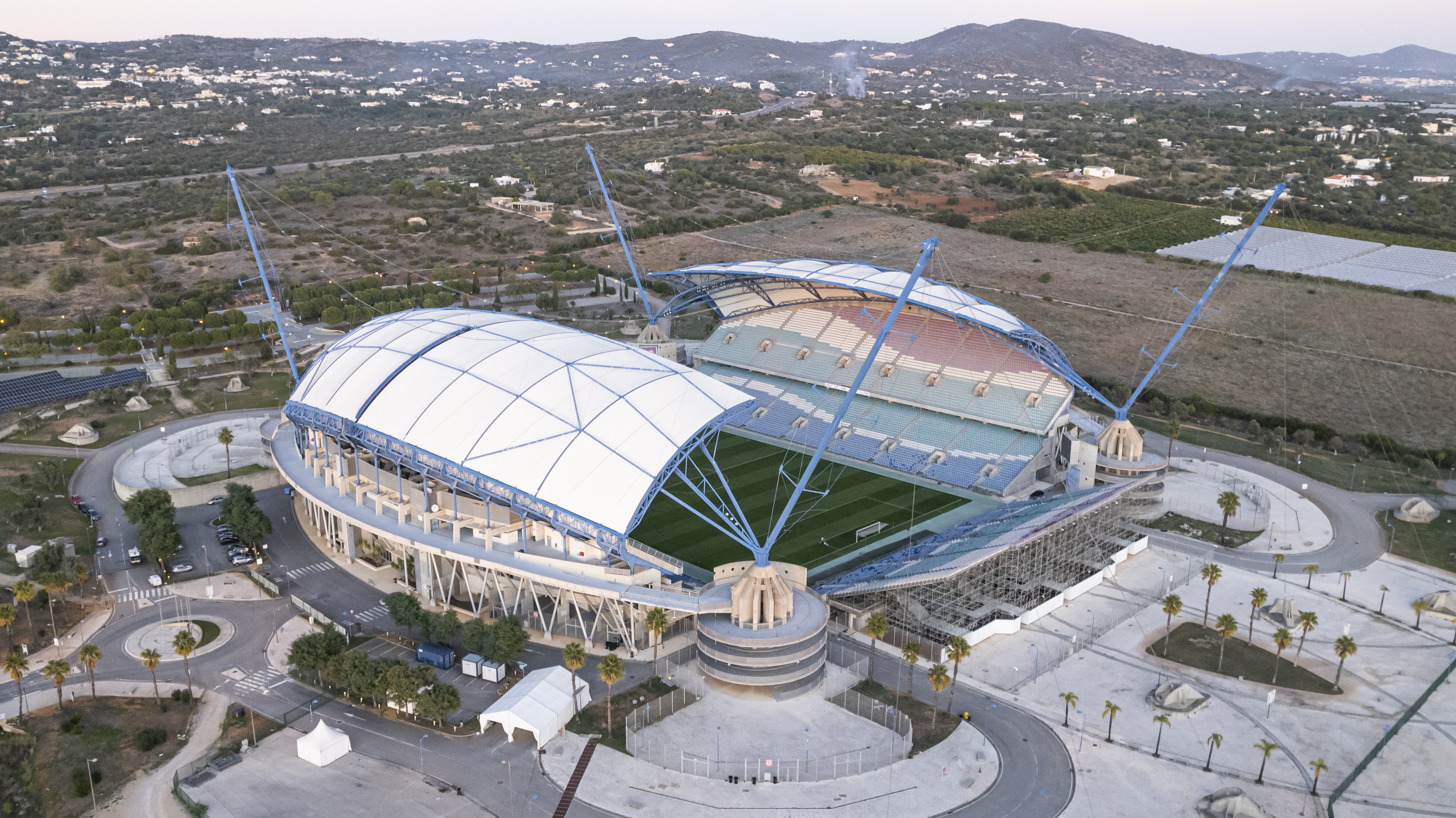
The Estádio Algarve opened for Euro 2004.

=== Sports ===
A 30,000-seat stadium Estádio Algarve, shared by the cities of Faro and Loulé, was one of the venues of the Euro 2004 football championship. Louletano Desportos Clube (a club from the city of Loulé) and Sporting Clube Farense (from Faro) also use smaller municipal stadiums. The stadium is also used for concerts, festivals, and other events.

== Notable people ==
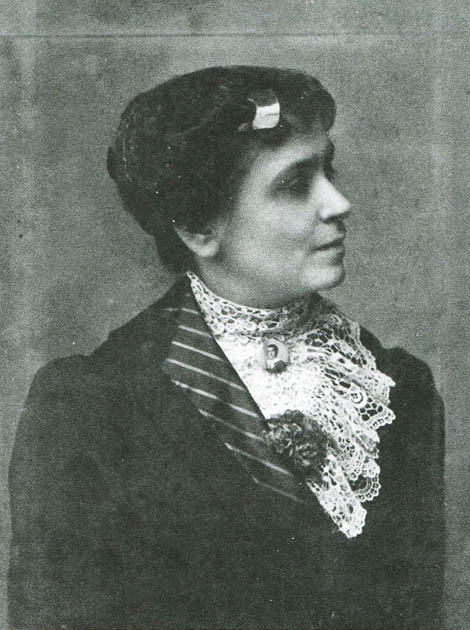
Maria Veleda, 1912

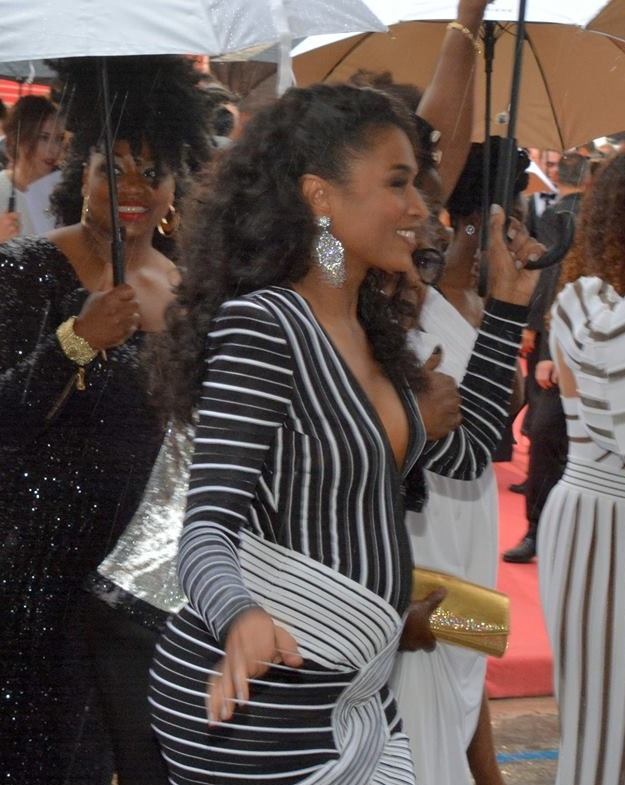
Sara Martins, 2018

- Bakr Ben Yahia, important Marrano figure in Gharb al-Andalus
- Madragana (born c. 1230), mistress to king Afonso III of Portugal
- Brites de Almeida (born 1350), known as the Baker of Aljubarrota, a legendary figure and Portuguese heroine whose name is associated with the victory of the Portuguese, against Castilian forces, at the Battle of Aljubarrota in 1385
- Francisco Barreto (1520–1573), soldier, explorer and an officer in Morocco
- José Maria da Ponte e Horta (1824–1892), Portuguese noble, Governor of Angola, Macau and Mozambique
- Sebastião Custódio de Sousa Teles (1847–1921), senior politician and military officer
- Maria Veleda (1871–1955), educator, journalist and activist
- Raul Pires Ferreira Chaves (1889–1967), civil engineer and inventor
- Adelino da Palma Carlos (1905–1992), first Prime Minister of Portugal after the Carnation Revolution of 1974
- Carlos Quintas (born 1951), stage and TV actor and singer
- Sara Martins (born 1977), Portuguese-born French actress of Cape Verdean descent
- Diogo Piçarra (born 1990), singer. He won the Portuguese version of Pop Idol in 2012

=== Sport ===
- Manuel Balela (born 1956), football coach
- Ana Dias (born 1974), long-distance and marathon runner; four-time Olympian
- Rui Machado (born 1984), retired professional tennis player
- Inês Murta (born 1997), tennis player
- José Rafael (born 1958), retired footballer
