= Bakr Ben Yahia =

Important Marrano figure in Medieval Portugal

Bakr Ben Yahia (born in the 9th century) was an important Marrano (Iberian crypto-Jew living as a Christian) figure in Gharb al-Andalus, modern-day Algarve in Portugal.

Bakr Ben Yahia was the son of Yahia Ben Bakr. Both Ben Bakr and Ben Yahia held political office and executed important construction in Faro. Bakr Ben Yahia is credited with constructing the walls, as well as the iron gates around the perimeter of Faro. It was during this time that he brought the image of Mary as it would be stated much later in the songs by King Alfonso X of Castile (1221 – 1284), and the settlement became known as Santa Maria (a former name of modern Faro).
