= Bakr Abdellaoui =

Finnish footballer (born 1997)

Personal information
- Full name: Bakr Sadiq Abdellaoui
- Date of birth: 8 July 1997 (age 29)
- Place of birth: Helsinki, Finland
- Height: 1.71 m (5 ft 7 in)
- Position: Midfielder

Youth career
- –2016: Getafe

Senior career*
| Years | Team | Apps | (Gls) |
| 2016–2017 | Leganés B | 16 | (2) |
| 2017–2018 | Alcorcón B | 9 | (1) |
| 2018–2019 | Académico de Viseu | 0 | (0) |
| 2019–2020 | Real Balompédica Linense | 12 | (0) |
| 2020–2021 | Östersund | 0 | (0) |
| 2020 | → Næstved (loan) | 1 | (0) |
| 2021 | Ljungskile | 19 | (1) |
| 2022 | Akademija Pandev | 1 | (0) |
| 2022–2023 | MFK Vyškov | 0 | (0) |
| 2022 | → Blansko (loan) | 12 | (0) |
| 2023–2024 | 1. SC Znojmo | 42 | (2) |
- * Club domestic league appearances and goals as of 23 December 2024

Bakr Sadiq Abdellaoui (born 8 July 1997) is a Finnish professional footballer who plays as a midfielder.

== Personal life ==
Abdellaoui was born in Helsinki, Finland, to a Finnish mother and a Moroccan father, and moved to Montreal, Canada, with his family when he was seven years old. He has citizenships of Finland, Morocco and Canada.

== Career statistics ==
As of 23 December 2024

Appearances and goals by club, season and competition
| Club | Season | League | | | Cups (Note: Includes Copa Federación, Danish Cup and Czech Cup) | | Total | |
| Club | Season | Division | Apps | Goals | Apps | Goals | Apps | Goals |
|---|---|---|---|---|---|---|---|---|
| Leganés B | 2016–17 | Tercera División | 16 | 2 | – | | 16 | 2 |
| Alcorcón B | 2017–18 | Tercera División | 9 | 1 | – | | 9 | 1 |
| Académico de Viseu | 2018–19 | LigaPro | 0 | 0 | 0 | 0 | 0 | 0 |
| Real Balompédica Linense | 2019–20 | Segunda División B | 12 | 0 | 2 | 0 | 14 | 0 |
| Östersund | 2020 | Allsvenskan | 0 | 0 | 0 | 0 | 0 | 0 |
| Næstved (loan) | 2020–21 | Danish 2nd Division | 1 | 0 | 1 | 0 | 2 | 0 |
| Ljungskile | 2021 | Ettan | 19 | 1 | 0 | 0 | 19 | 1 |
| Akademija Pandev | 2021–22 | Macedonian First League | 1 | 0 | 0 | 0 | 1 | 0 |
| MFK Vyškov | 2022–23 | FNL | 0 | 0 | 1 | 0 | 1 | 0 |
| Blansko (loan) | 2022–23 | MSFL | 12 | 0 | 0 | 0 | 12 | 0 |
| 1. SC Znojmo | 2023–24 | MSFL | 27 | 1 | 2 | 0 | 29 | 1 |
| 1. SC Znojmo | 2024–25 | MSFL | 15 | 1 | 0 | 0 | 15 | 1 |
| 1. SC Znojmo | Total | | 42 | 2 | 2 | 0 | 44 | 2 |
| Career total | | | 112 | 6 | 6 | 0 | 118 | 6 |
