= Barreta Island =

Island in southern Portugal

Coordinates: 36.970°N 7.924°W

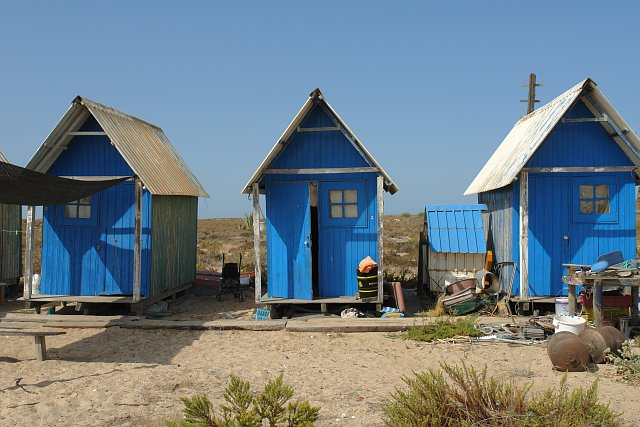
Fishermen's shelter houses

Barreta Island (Portuguese: Ilha da Barreta) is an island in Algarve, Portugal, about 7 kilometres (4.3 mi) long and 50 to 600 metres (160 to 1,970 ft) wide.

Barreta is also known as Deserta, Deserted Island or Santa Maria Cape Island. It is one of the more isolated islands in Algarve.

Access to the island is possible by a public ferry line everyday, all year round. It can also be reached by renting or owning a boat. In this island is located the southernmost point of continental Portugal, Cabo de Santa Maria.

A beach on the island is used by naturists.

== See also ==
- Cabo de Santa Maria (Faro)
