= Bakriyyah =

Shiite polemical term to refer to Sunnis or heterodox sect of Islam

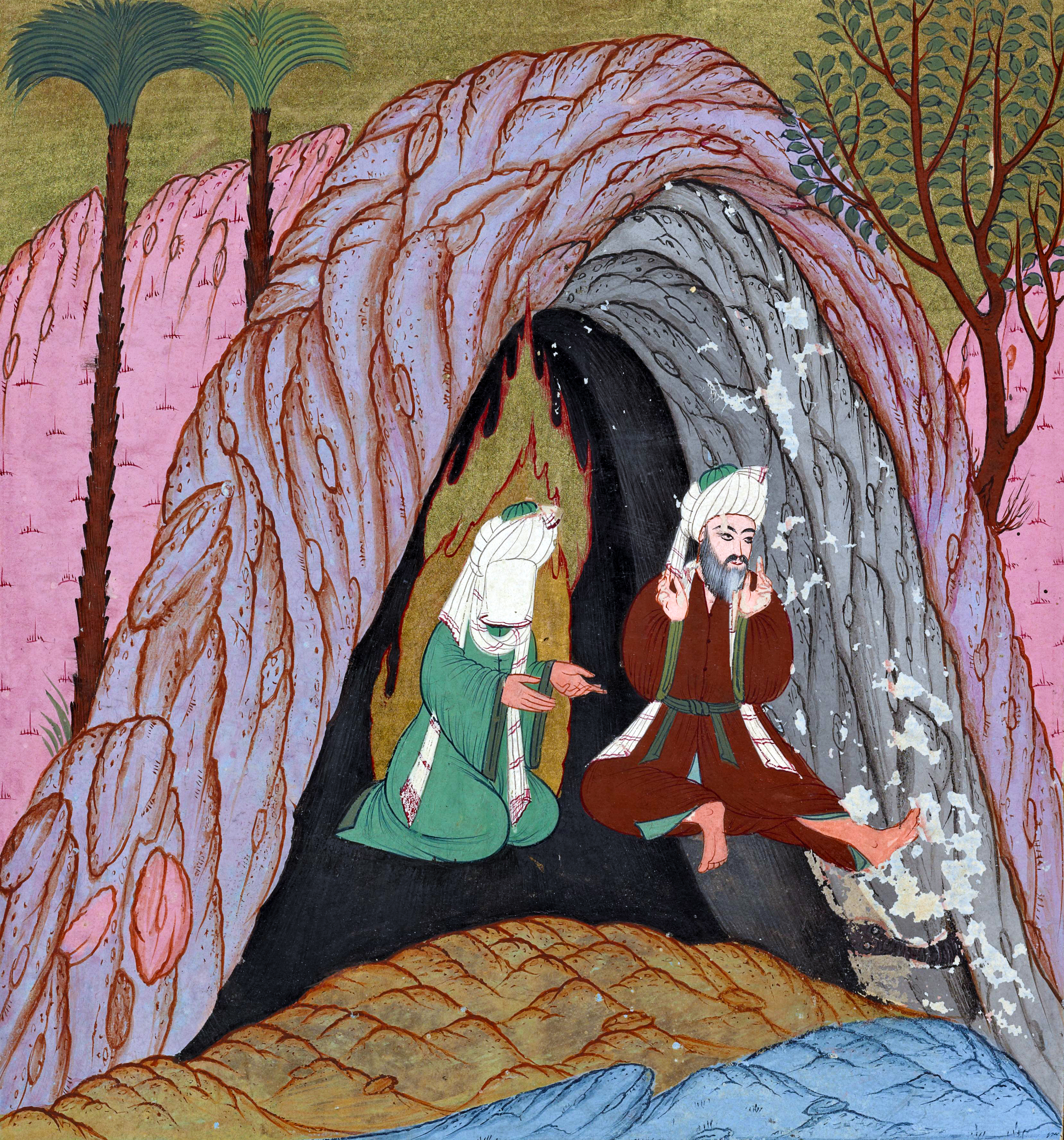
Abu Bakr (right) hiding in the cave near Jabal Thawr

Bakriyya or Bakrism (Arabic: البكرية al-bakriyya, singular adherent and adjective Bakri) is an ambiguous Arabic term that can refer to one of three things. It originally referred to a small 7th-century group of hadith transmitters who promoted sayings about the supposed exalted qualities of Abu Bakr in response to proto-Shiite compilations about the qualities of Ali and his claim to lead all Muslims. This use of the term was employed by al-Nawbakhti, and al-Qummi.

A second usage concerns a figure called Bakr ibn Ukht Abd al-Wahid ibn Zayd, the son of the sister of Hasan al-Basri Abd al-Wahid bin Zayd. He likely taught that God would appear as a human being in the end times, but only inhibiting a human body not being one and that Rūḥ formed the essence of mankind. He held what commentators perceived as extreme positions regarding the fate of Muslims who sin. His convictions also translated to practical beliefs such as not being allowed in a mosque after having eaten odorous foods. He did however allow the consumption of alcohol. The term was used by writers such as al-Mas'udi, al-Ash'ari, al-Baghdadi and Ibn Taymiyya.

The third and most current usage is a conflation of the two groups in later Shiite polemics. Imagining the Bakriyya religious movement to be about Abu Bakr's claim to succession and not one following the heterodox views of Bakr ibn Ukht Abd al-Wahid ibn Zayd. This use avoids the use of sunna when referring to the Sunni sect of Islam. It was employed by writers such as Ibn Qiba al-Razi, Shaykh TusiIbn Babawayh, Ali ibn Tawus al-Hilli and al-Shaykh al-Mufid.

== See also ==
- Rafida
