= University of Algarve =

Portuguese public higher education institution

Coordinates: 37°1′20.5″N 7°55′39.5″W

- Universidade do Algarve
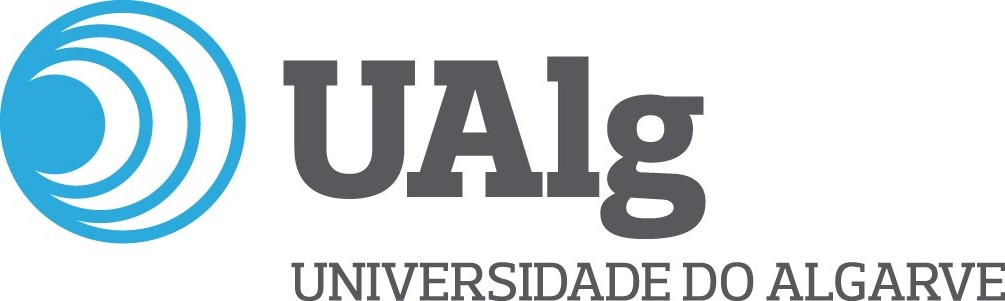
- Motto: Estudar Onde É Bom Viver (Study Where Life Is Good)
- Type: Public university
- Established: 1979
- Rector: Paulo Águas
- Students: 10,000
- Location: Faro, Portugal
- Website: ualg.pt

The University of Algarve (UAlg; Portuguese: Universidade do Algarve), founded in 1979, is a Portuguese public higher education institution located in the southernmost region of mainland Portugal, the Algarve, having its headquarters and two out of its three campuses in Faro (namely the Gambelas and Penha) and another campus in Portimão. It has around 10,000 students, 20 per cent of whom are international, from more than 90 nationalities, with Brazil being the most representative country of origin for those foreign students.

== History ==
Founded on 16 January 1979 when its foundation was voted in the Portuguese Parliament, the University of Algarve results from the union of two preexisting institutions, the University of Algarve (created by Law number 11/79 from 28 March 1979) and the Polytechnic Institute of Faro (created by Law 513-T/79 from 26 December 1979), which makes it somewhat different from most universities given that colleges and schools (university faculdades and polytechnic escolas superiores) of both systems, co-exist, and it was also the only Portuguese university created by law. In 1982, the first rector of the university, Gomes Guerreiro (1982-1986) was appointed, followed by Lloyd Braga (1986-1990), Montalvão Marques (1990-1993), Alte da Veiga (1993-1997), Adriano Pimpão (1998-2006), João Guerreiro (2006-2013), António Branco, rector since 2013, followed by Paulo Águas. Following the approval of the Universities Autonomy Law, the Assembly of the University of the Algarve, comprising the representatives of academic and administrative staff and students of all the faculties and schools, approved the Statutes in 1991, which received approval by the Ministry of Education. In 2001, the first University Statute amendment was published in the Portuguese government official gazette. Since its foundation to the 2010s, the university witnessed a significant growth in terms of student population, modern facilities and the quality and diversity of programs on offer. The medical school of the state funded University of Algarve opened its doors to its first 32 new students in September 2009.

== Students and staff ==
The university student population is about 10,000 and operates over 40 graduate and 68 postgraduate programs (approximately 52 MSc and 16 PhD), counting with around 700 permanent teaching and research staff that developed a significant number of research projects and intellectual property, enhanced also by both the research work produced by more than 120 fellowship grant holders focused on R&D&I and the university business incubator which is a source for entrepreneurial business assistance and seed funding for the development of startup companies.

== Cultural and sports activities ==
The Student Union of the University of Algarve (AAUAlg) is a centralized representative body of the students, founded on 1 October 1997. Before then there were six independent smaller student associations at the university representing each school or college of the University of Algarve. Sports activities are under the auspices of the students' union in collaboration with the university and the Student Support and Welfare Services. UAlg students run a university radio station as well as a theatrical troupe. The Students Union Sports Department promotes sports activities from salsa to hip-hop, from tai chi and yoga to bujinkan, from basketball to football. Sports Department of the Student Union activities such as canoeing, windsurfing and sailing are free of charge for UAlg students at the Nautical Sports Centre at Faro Island (Centro Náutico da Ilha de Faro). Competitive sports include handball, women’s futsal, women and men’s volleyball and men’s rugby. Federated teams (district championships) are active in men and women’s basketball, futsal and football. The AAUAlg has also a competitive esports department.

The Student Union also organises:

- the Semana Académica (Student Academic Week) in May;
- the Sports Festival in September, in the streets of downtown Faro, with exhibitions and workshops on sports activities;
- the Snow Campus, a winter event for skiing and snowboarding;
- the Sports Exchange Programme, with national and international teams;
- the Academic University Sports Federation tournaments, such as the Open Tennis, Volleyball and Beach Rugby tournaments; the Non-Federated National University Championships;
- the University Student Union Mini Half-Marathon.

== Portimão branch ==
The Portimão branch of UAlg, 70 km to the west of Faro's UAlg headquarters, awards degrees in business management and tourism as well as technical specialization courses in accountancy and post-graduation in real estate appraisal & management.

== Gallery ==
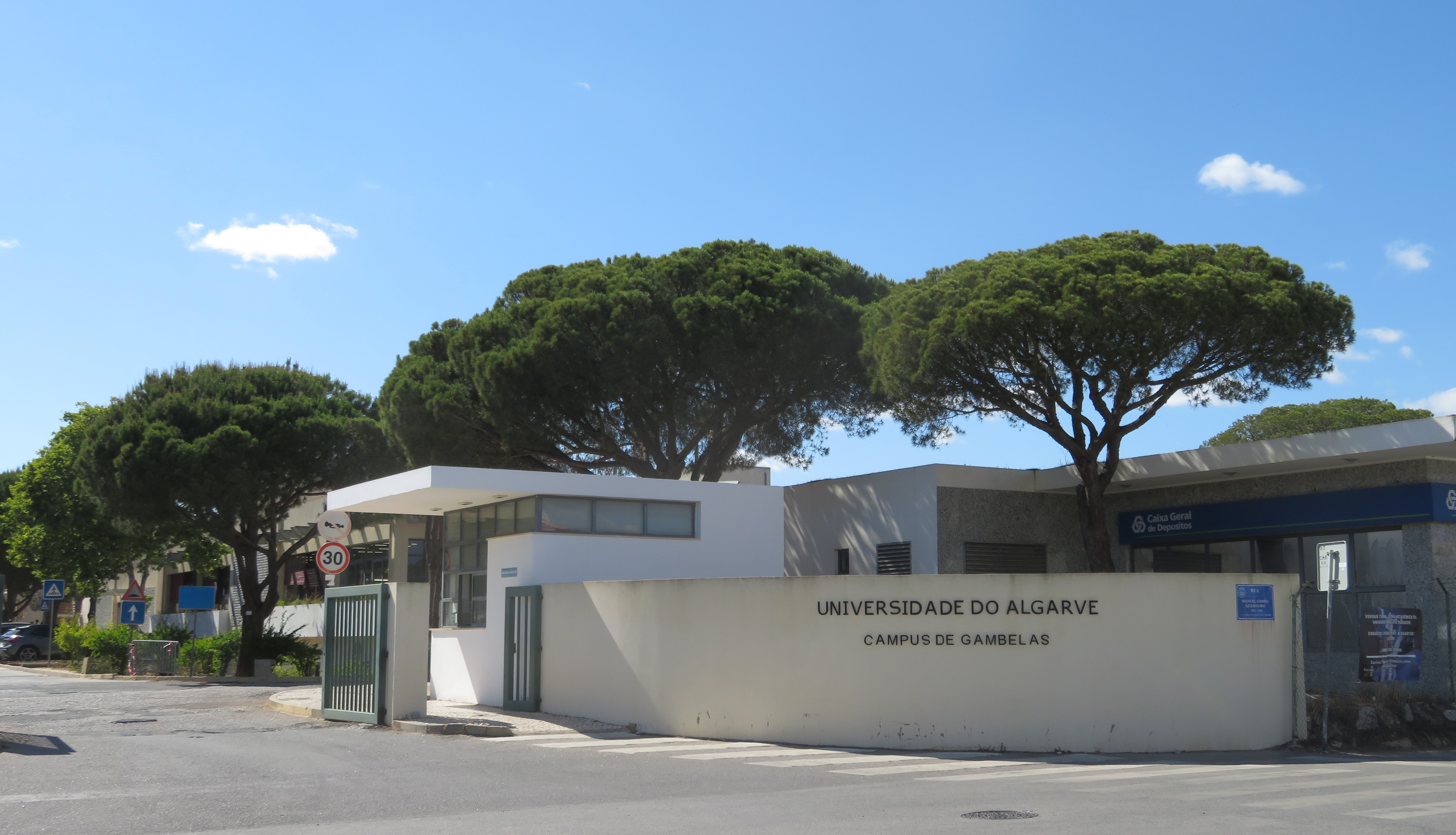
Entrance to UAlg's Gambelas Campus, Faro

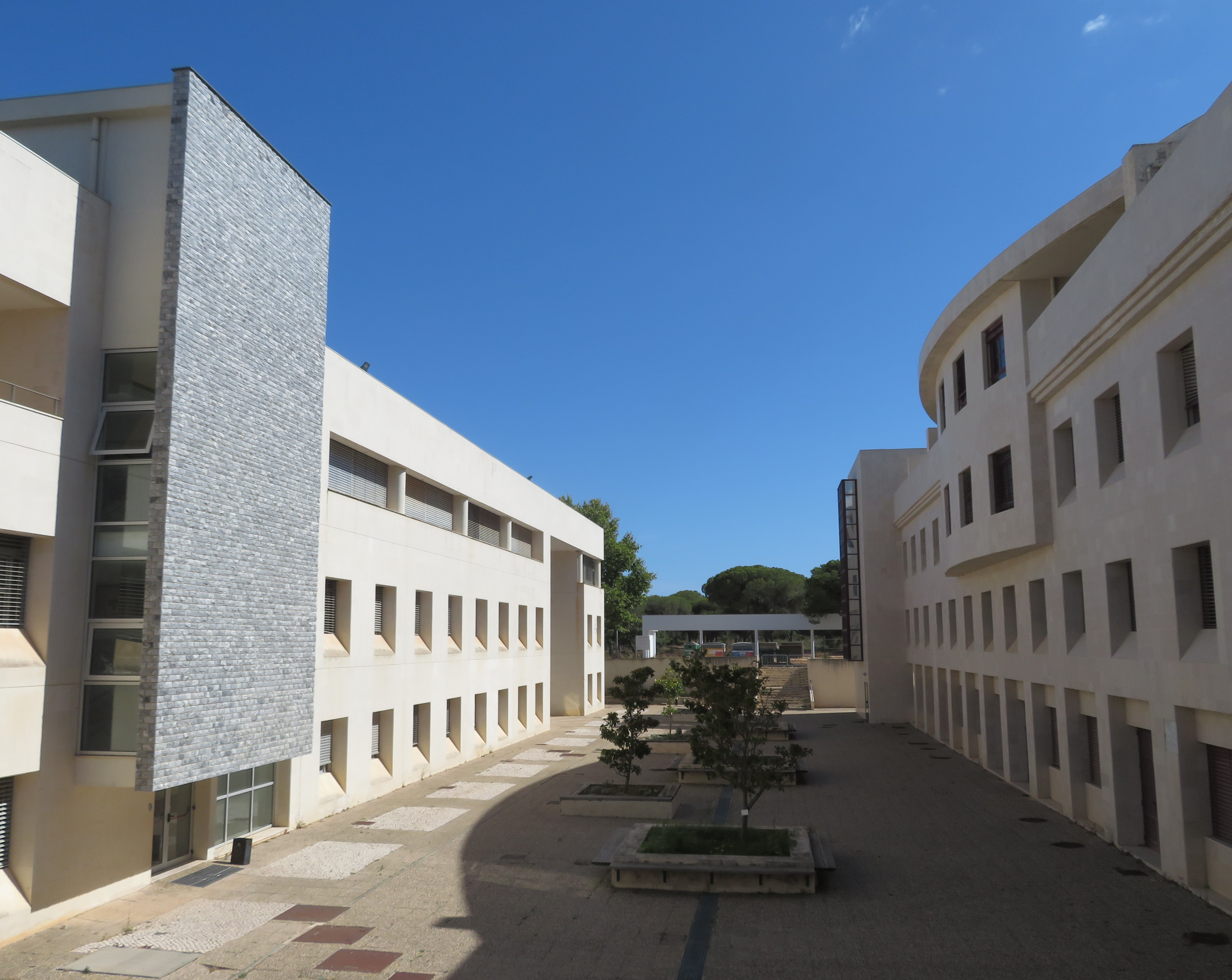
Buildings in UAlg's Gambelas Campus, Faro

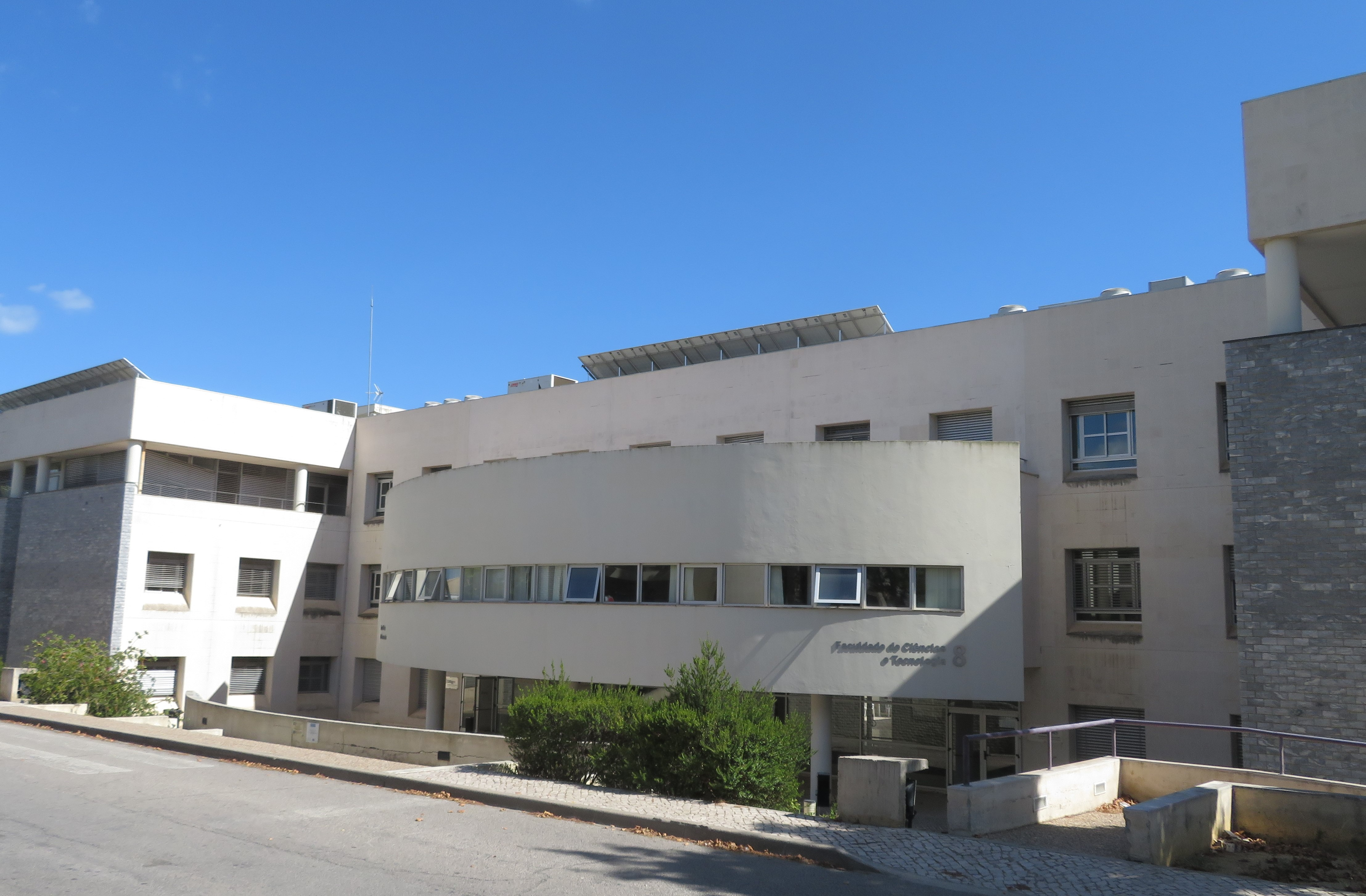
Buildings in UAlg's Gambelas Campus, Faro

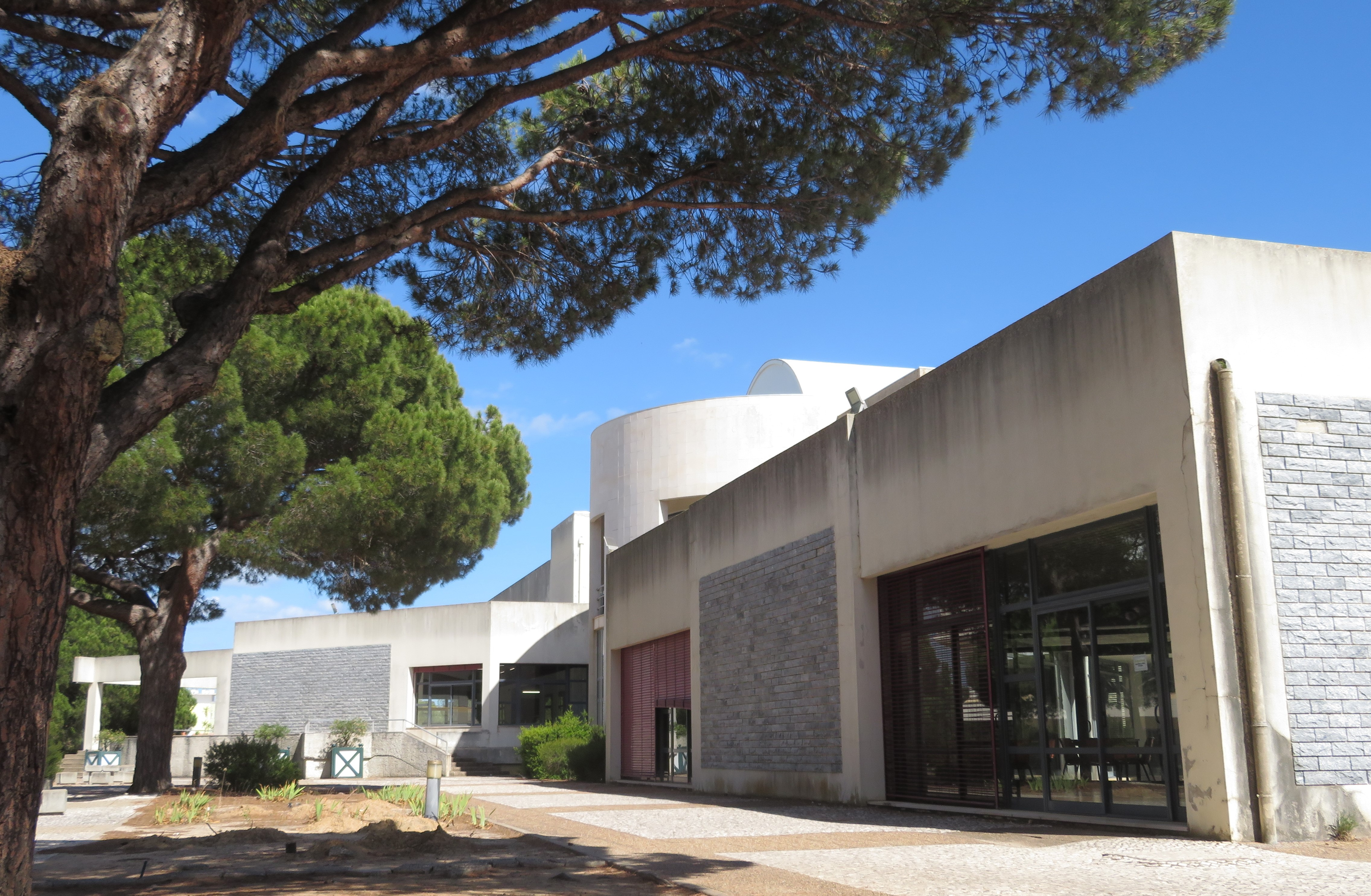
Buildings in UAlg's Gambelas Campus, Faro

== See also ==
- List of universities in Portugal
- Higher education in Portugal
