= Marcia Bakry =

American scientific illustrator

Marcia Bakry (born 1937) is an American artist and the scientific illustrator for the Smithsonian's National Museum of Natural History's Department of Anthropology.

Her illustrations are included in various academic books and scholarly articles. Books featuring her work include Mississippian Communities and Households, Handbook of North American Indians, V. 12, Plateau, and Anthropology Explored, Second Edition. Her art was shown at the 2017 Artists at Work exhibition at the Smithsonian's S. Dillon Ripley Center.
