= Yahia Ben Bakr =

Yahia Ben Bakr (born in the 9th century) was an important Mozarab (Iberian Christian or, in some instances, a Christianized Iberian Jew, living under Muslim domination) figure in the al-Gharb al-Andalus. He was a member of a family of muladís who revolted in the year 879 in Xantamarya, Al-Gharb (now the city of Faro in Algarve, Portugal) against the power of the Emir of Cordoba, remaining independent for about 50 years. The Bakr government spanned three generations, personified by Yahia Ben Bakr, his son Bakr Ben Yahia, and later Calafe Ben Bakr.

Yahia Ben Bakr was of Jewish descent, the son of a Bakr Ben Yahia (not to confuse with Yahia Ben Bakr's son, also called Bakr Ben Yahia) and an ancestor of Yahia Ben Yahi III, a Sephardi Jew who would be later entrusted by King Afonso I of Portugal, in 12th century, with the post of supervisor of tax collection and was nominated the first Chief-Rabbi of Portugal.

Yahia Ben Bakr was succeeded in office by his son, Bakr Ben Yahia. Both Ben Bakr and Ben Yahia held political office and executed important construction in Faro. Bakr Ben Yahia is credited with constructing the walls, as well as the iron gates around the perimeter of Faro. It is during this time that he brought the image of Mary as it would be stated much later in the songs by King Alfonso X of Castile (1221 – 1284).
