= Culatra Island =

Island in southern Portugal

Coordinates: 36.988°N 7.838°W

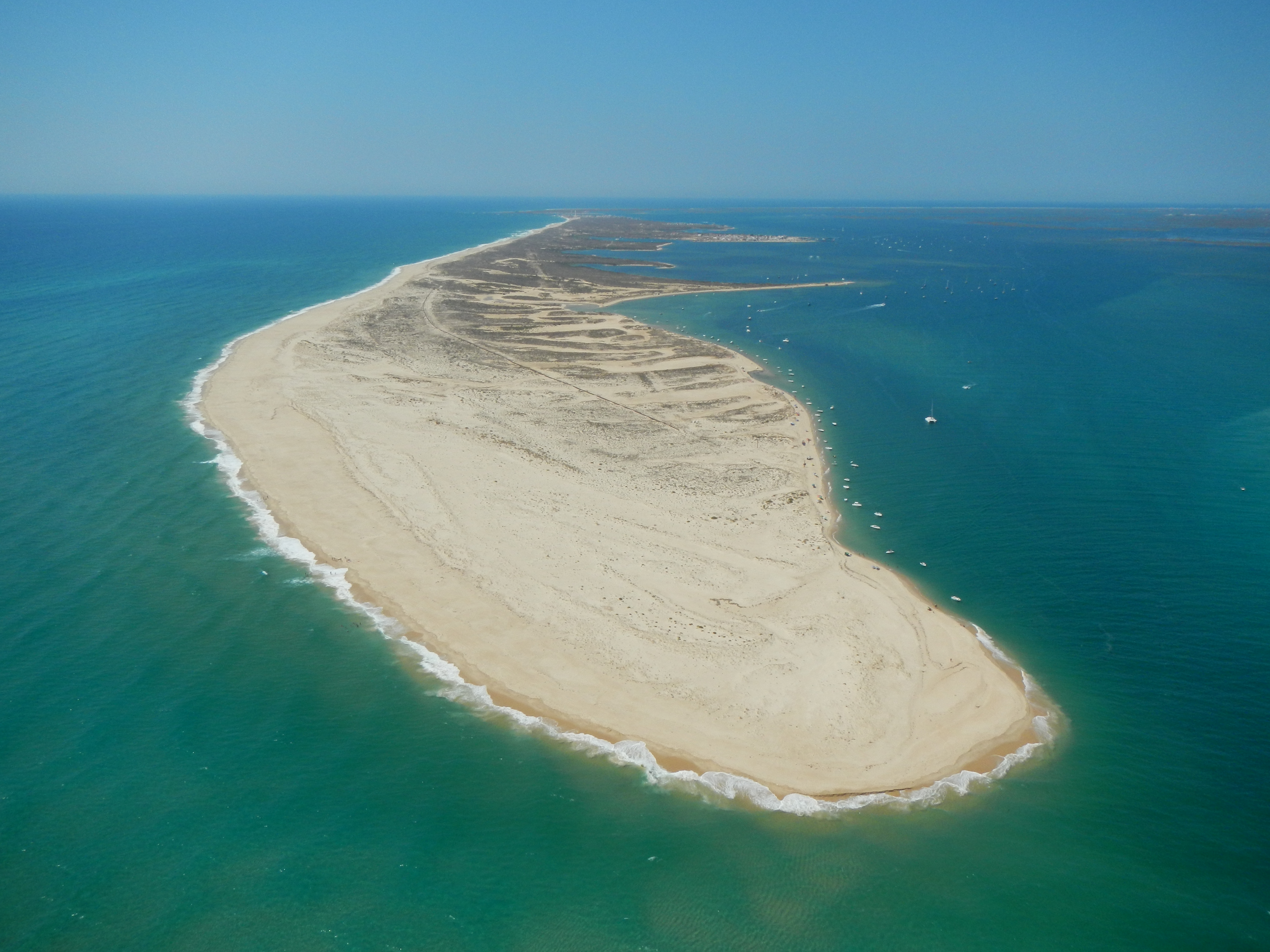
Culatra Island

Culatra Island is a barrier island located in the Ria Formosa in the Algarve region of Portugal. It has an approximate population of around 700 people divided across three communities of Farol, Hângares and Culatra.

== Geography & Layout ==
The island is located 10 km from Faro, and 6 km east of the town of Olhão. Administratively, the island belongs to the freguesia of Faro (Sé e São Pedro). The island is around 6 kilometres in length and ranges from 100 to 900 metres in width. Public access to the island is possible by year-round ferry service from both Faro and Olhão. Private water taxis are also available.

The island has an extensive sandy beach on its ocean side, while the lagoon side is used for anchorage for yachts and boats. Throughout the island is a range of protected sand dunes that are part of the protected area of the Ria Formosa Natural Park. Several raised wooden walkways provide access through the dunes to the main beach of Praia da Culatra. On the western tip of the island is the historic Farol de Santa Maria lighthouse.

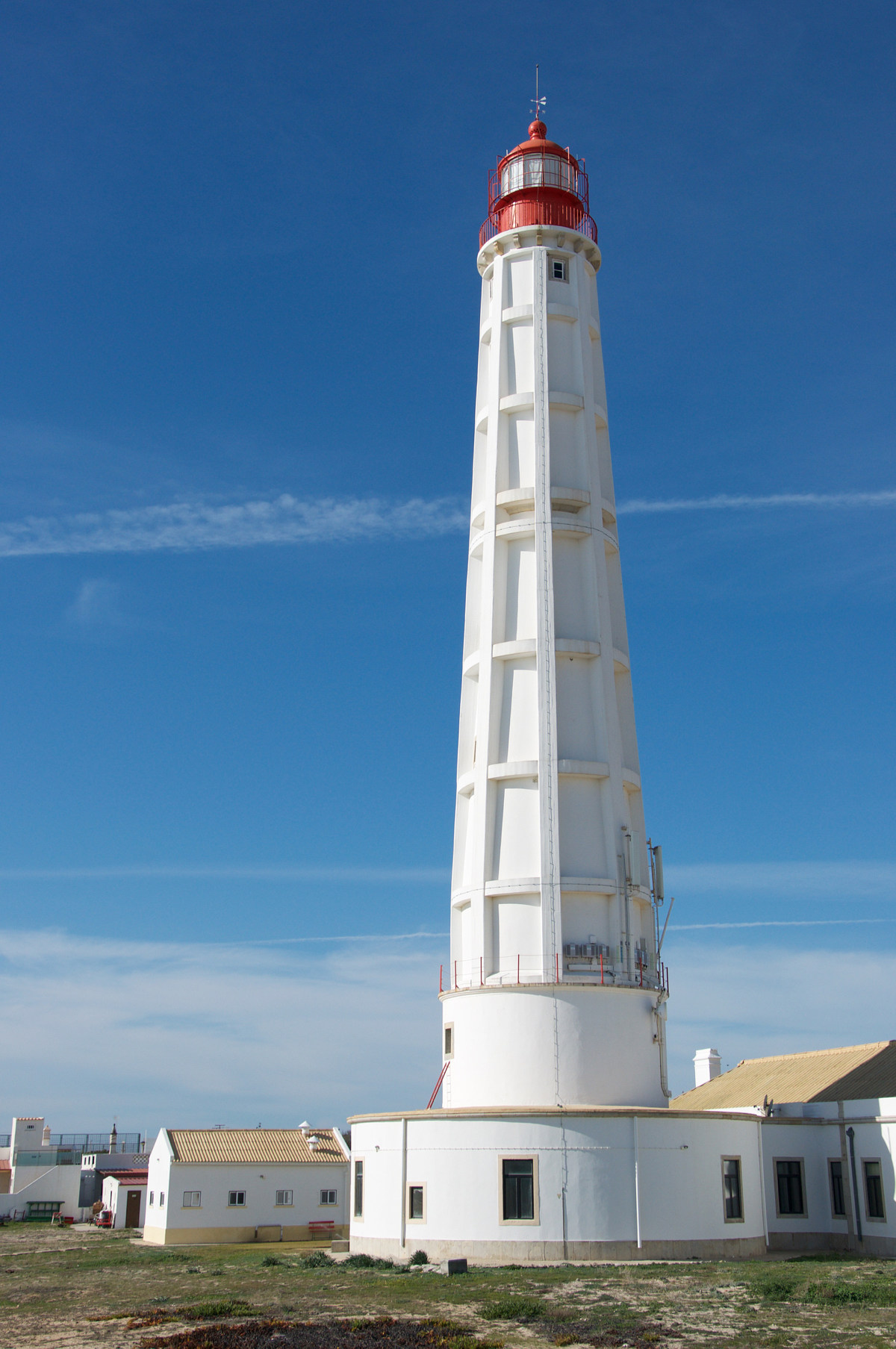
Cabo de Santa Maria Lighthouse on Culatra Island

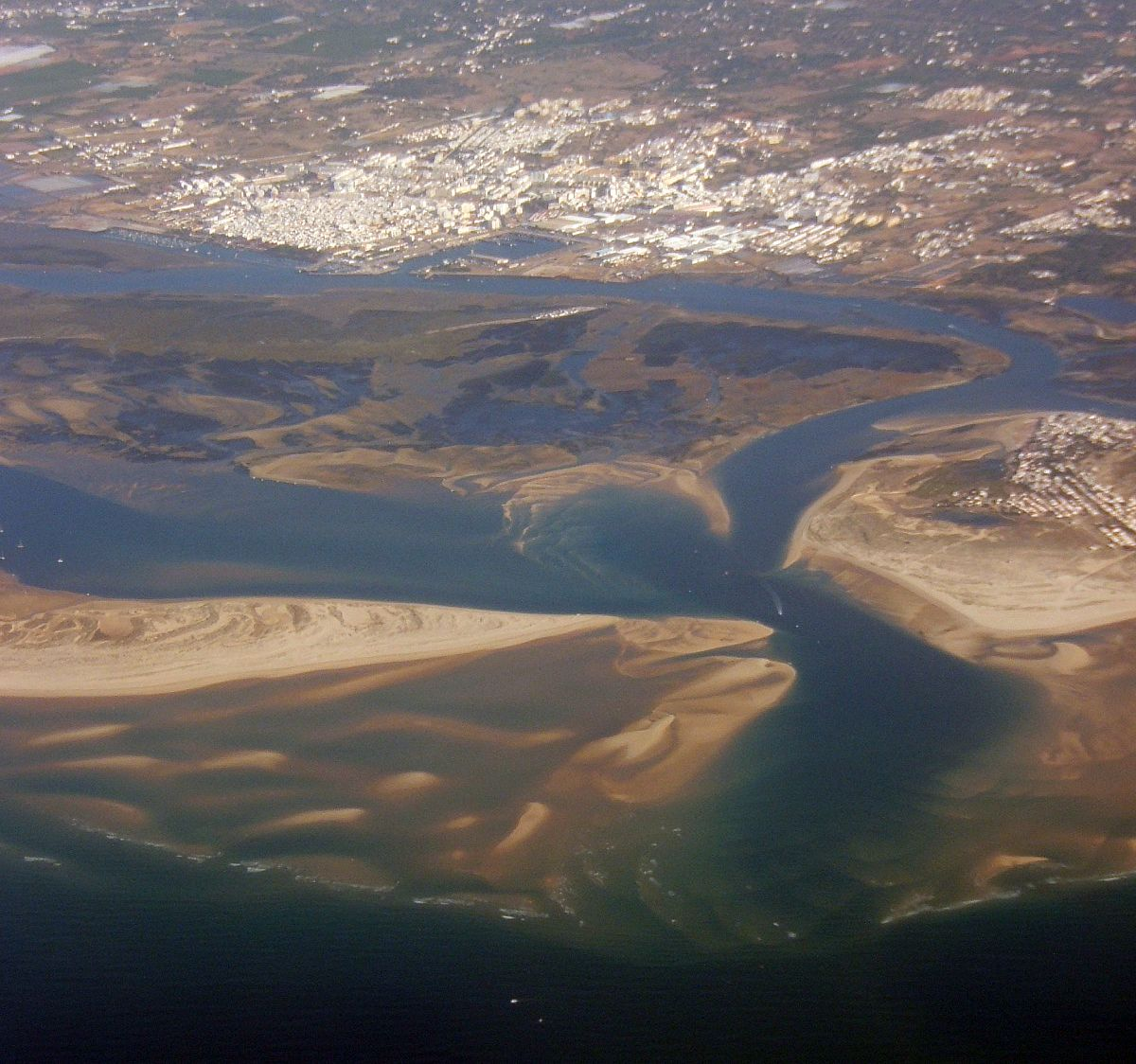
Ilha da Armona (right) and Ilha da Culatra (left)
