= Fuseta =

Fuzeta
- Civil parish
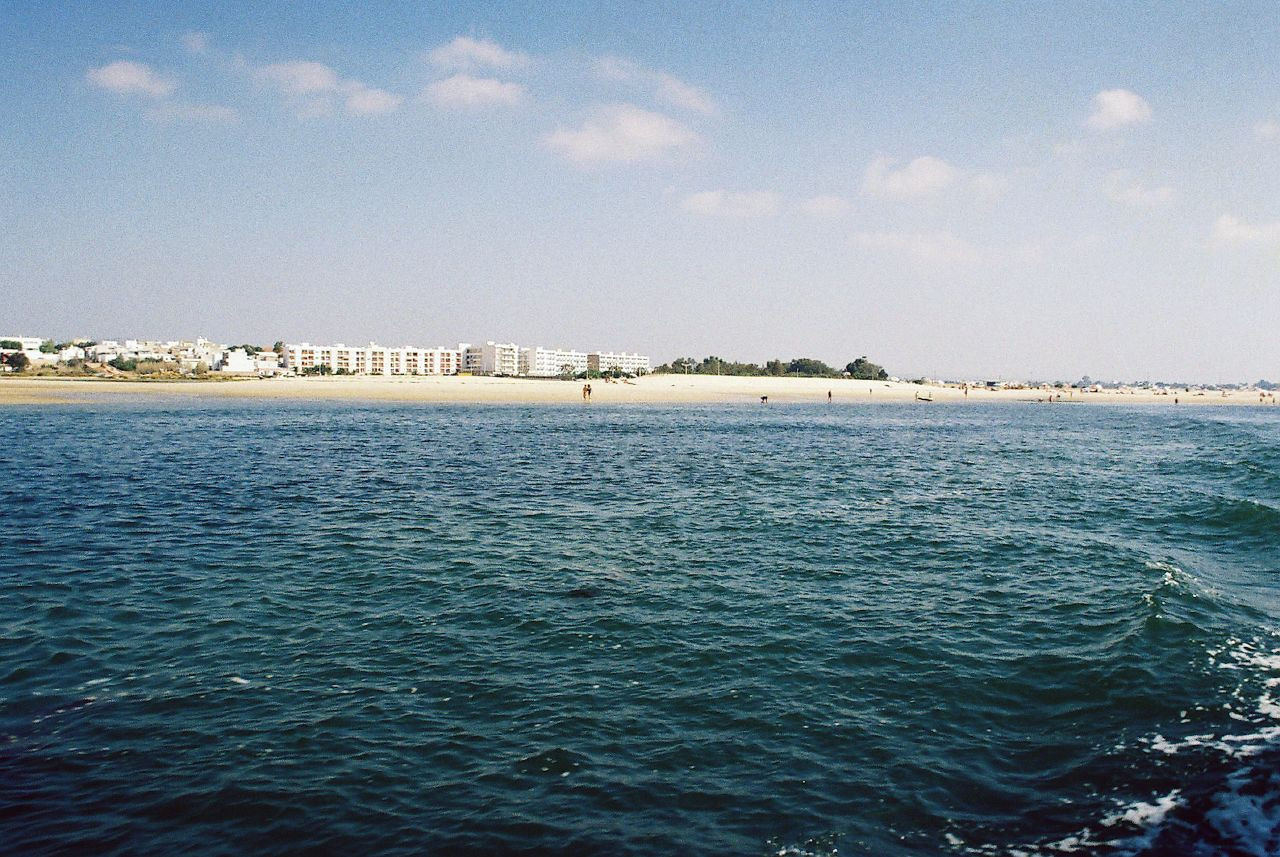
- The shoreline and beachhead along the Atlantic coast of Fuseta

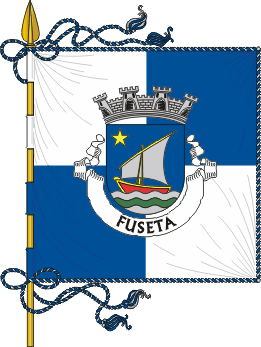
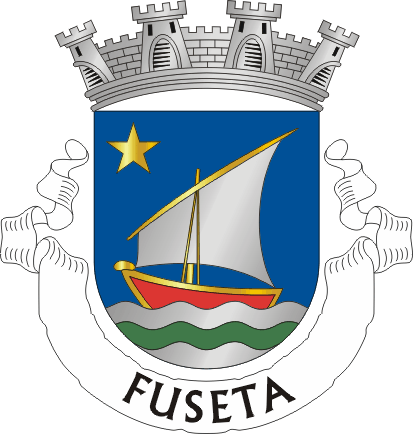
- Flag Coat of arms

- Location in Portugal
- Coordinates: 37°3′N 7°45′W
- Country: Portugal
- Region: Algarve
- Intermunic. comm.: Algarve
- District: Faro
- Municipality: Olhão
- Established: Settlement: 1572; Parish: 12 March 1874
- Disbanded: 2013

Area
  - Total: 0.36 km^{2} (0.14 sq mi)

Population (2001)
  - Total: 2,146
  - Density: 6,000/km^{2} (15,000/sq mi)
- Time zone: UTC+00:00 (WET)
  - Summer (DST): UTC+01:00 (WEST)
- Postal code: 8700-019
- Area code: 289
- Patron: Nossa Senhora do Carmo

Fuseta (Portuguese pronunciation: [fuˈzetɐ]) is a former civil parish in the municipality of Olhão, Portugal. In 2013, the parish merged into the new parish Moncarapacho e Fuseta. The parish occupies an area of approximately 0.36 square kilometres (0.14 mi^{2}) and at the 2001 census had a population of 2,146. This parish belonged to the Tavira Municipality until 1876.

== History ==
Fuseta, dates back to 1572, when it was then referred to as Fozeta, a name that is derived from the diminutive for foz (referring to river mouth); the Rio Tronoco disgorges into the sea from this location. Initially, the area was just a collection of small shacks used by fishermen to store tools for their fishing boats. Gradually, it developed into a small settlement.

Fuseta was first mentioned during the Portuguese Age of Discovery, when many of the villages fishermen shipped aboard the caravels to the spice routes and expeditions in the Far East. Gaspar Corte-Real, a nobleman and resident of this area, claimed to have discovered the land now known as Newfoundland in 1500, beginning many of the Portuguese ventures onto the Grand Banks in search of cod.

The oldest religious place of worship in Fuseta, the Chapel of Nossa Senhora do Carmo (Our Lady of Carmo) existed by 1758. As the population grew, the Bishop of the Algarve, D. Francisco Gomes de Avelar, was petitioned to grant the ecumenical independence of the parish, which had previously been included in Moncarapacho. Although Fuseta became its own parish on 12 March 1874, by Bishop D. André, who indicated that the parish would remain a suffragette of Moncarapacho until population levels grow significantly. It was Bishop D. Francisco Gomes, on 22 October 1802, who finally established the new independent parish.

By 1790, the settlement included 90 fishermen and six fishing boats, which fished in the waters around Laraxe between April and September. From October to the end of Easter these fishermen would fish around Setúbal and unloaded in Lisbon.

In 1835, the parish was exempted from paying fees to the Diocese by the Governor of the Bishop, Dr. António de Santo Ilídio da Fonseca e Silva. It was then that Fonseca and Silva determined the need to construct the parochial church, which was visited in 1898 by King Carlos. It was constructed on an elevated place using the income from maritime compromises in 1825 that separated Fuseta and Tavira.

== Economy ==
The principal economic activity of Fuseta remains fishing and its derivatives. Owing to the beaches, camping parks and proximity to the island of Armona-Fuseta, the tourism industry has been growing.

== Geography ==
With an area of 0.36 square kilometres (0.14 mi^{2}), Fuseta is located along the Algarvean coast, bounded on the north and west by the parish of Moncarapacho, to the south by the Ria Formosa and along the east by the municipality of Tavira.

== Architecture ==
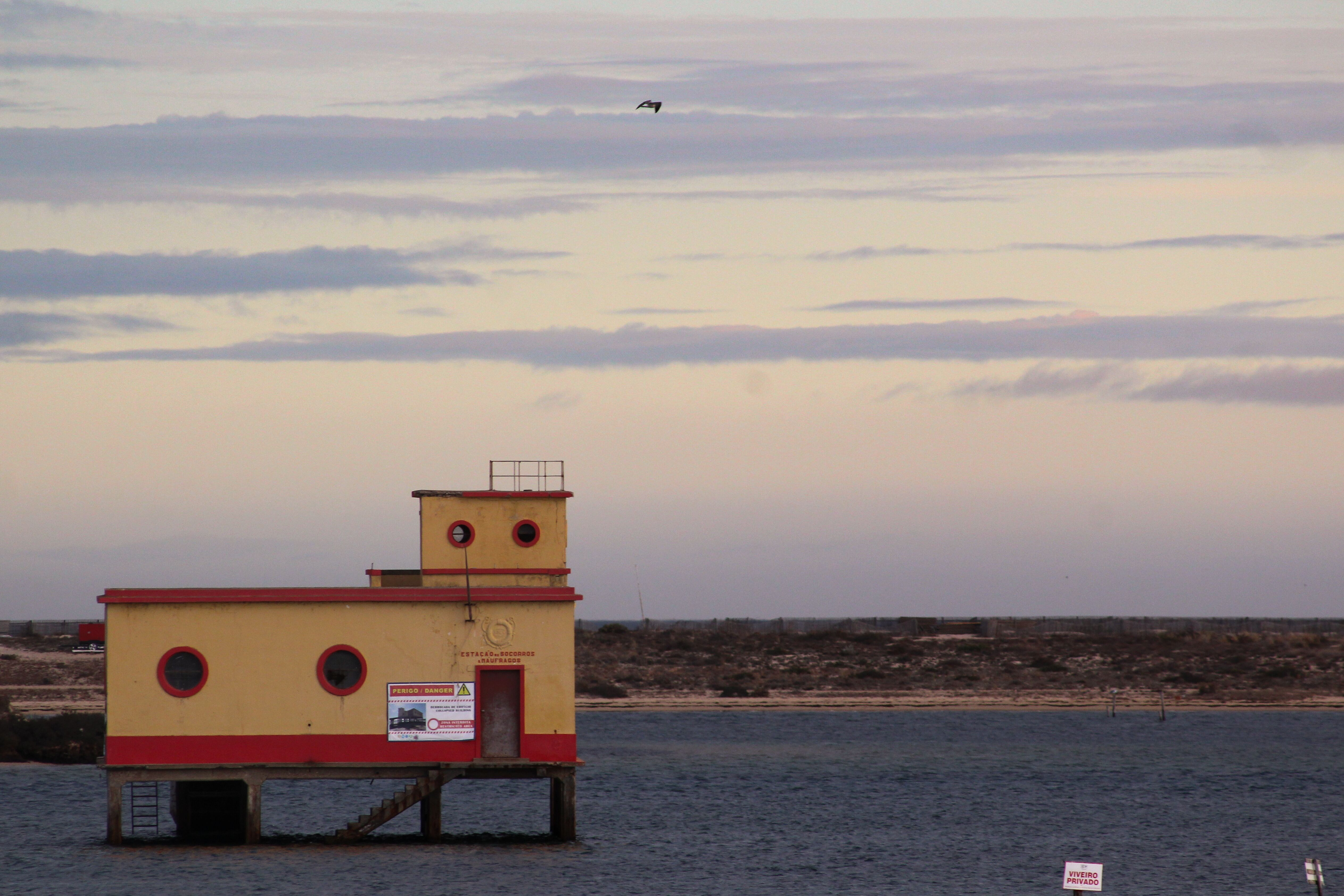
Historic lifeguard building off the beach in Fuseta, considered an icon of the town.

=== Civic ===
- Cinema Topázio (Portuguese: Cinema Topázio)
- Maritime Police Delegation of Fuseta (Portuguese: Delegação Marítima da Fuseta)
- Neighborhood Fishermens' Residences (Portuguese: Bairro de Casas para Pescadores de Fuseta)
- Social Day Centre of Nossa Senhora do Carmo (Portuguese: Centro Social e Posto de Puericultura do Bairro de Pescadores de Fuseta/Centro de Dia Nossa Senhora do Carmo)
- Social Welfare Centre of Nossa Senhora de Fátima (Portuguese: Edifício na Rua da Igreja n.º 21/Colónia Balnear do Centro de Bem-Estar Social Nossa Senhora de Fátima de Olhão)
