= Pechão =

- Civil parish
- Location in Portugal
- Coordinates: 37.057°N 7.872°W
- Country: Portugal
- Region: Algarve
- Intermunic. comm.: Algarve
- District: Faro
- Municipality: Olhão

Area
  - Total: 19.79 km^{2} (7.64 sq mi)

Population (2011)
  - Total: 3,601
  - Density: 182.0/km^{2} (471.3/sq mi)
- Time zone: UTC+00:00 (WET)
  - Summer (DST): UTC+01:00 (WEST)

Pechão is a Portuguese parish in the municipality of Olhão. The population in 2011 was 3,601, in an area of 19.79 km².
