= Olhão (parish) =

- Civil parish
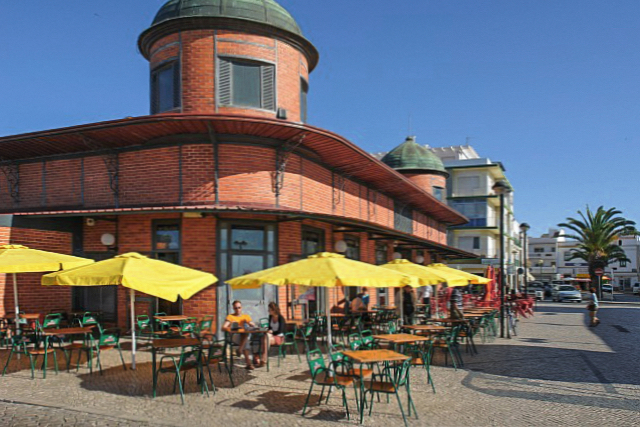
- The marketplace

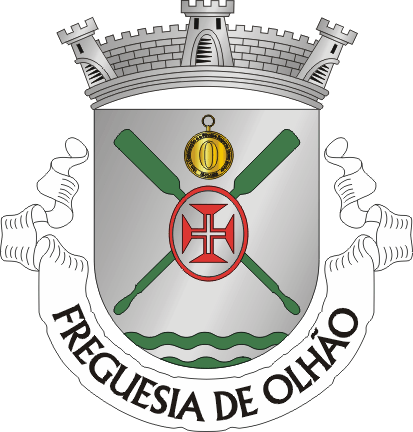
- Coat of arms

- Location in Portugal
- Coordinates: 37.026°N 7.841°W
- Country: Portugal
- Region: Algarve
- Intermunic. comm.: Algarve
- District: Faro
- Municipality: Olhão

Area
  - Total: 12.25 km^{2} (4.73 sq mi)

Population (2011)
  - Total: 14,914
  - Density: 1,217/km^{2} (3,153/sq mi)
- Time zone: UTC+00:00 (WET)
  - Summer (DST): UTC+01:00 (WEST)
- Postal code: 8700
- Area code: 289
- Website: http://www.jf-olhao.pt/

Olhão is a civil parish in the municipality of Olhão, in the Portuguese Algarve. The population in 2011 was 14,914, in an area of 12.25 km². Olhão is the largest parish by population density in the municipality.

== Architecture ==
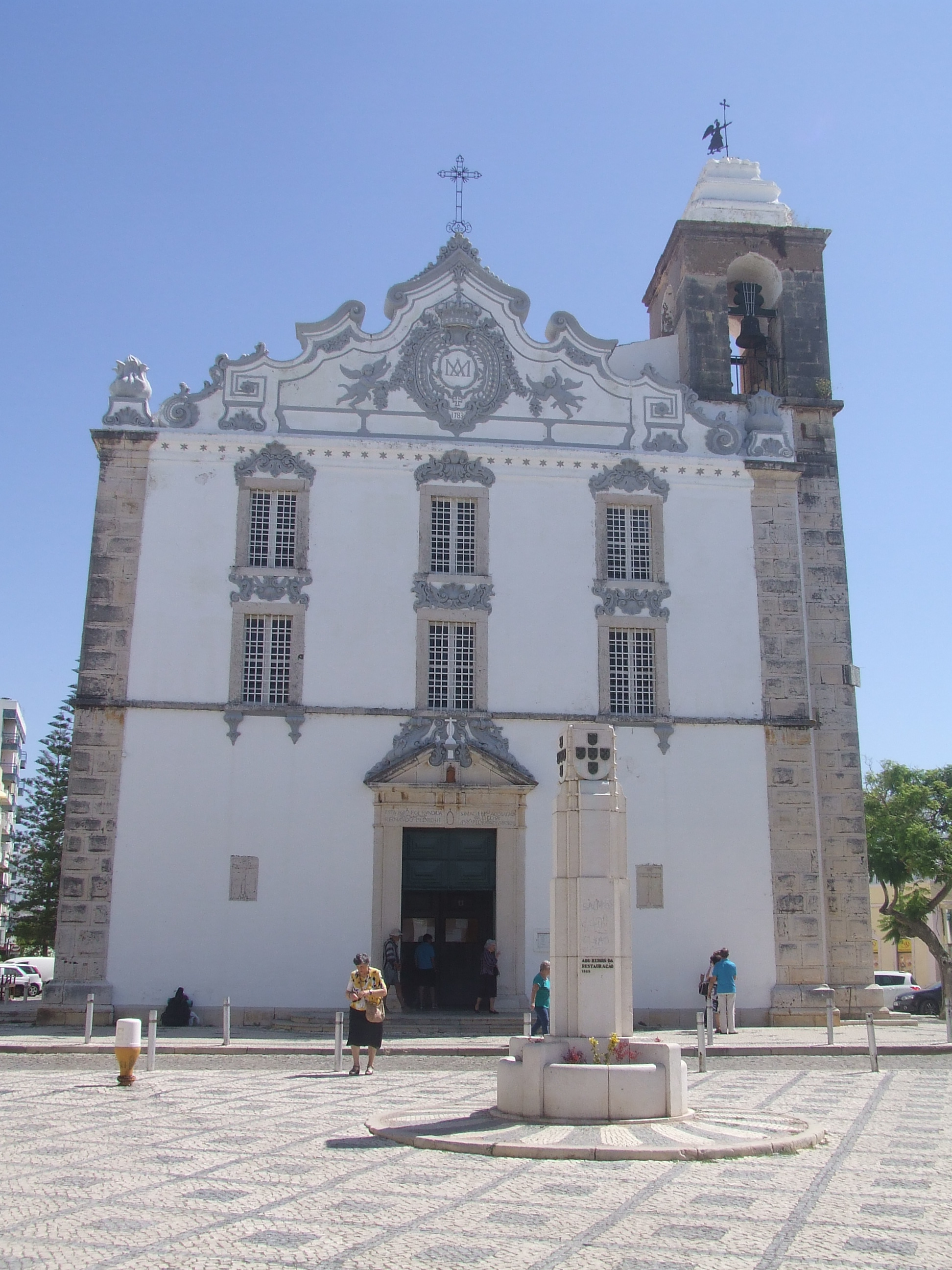
Church of Nossa Senhora do Rosário front elevation (south), July 2014

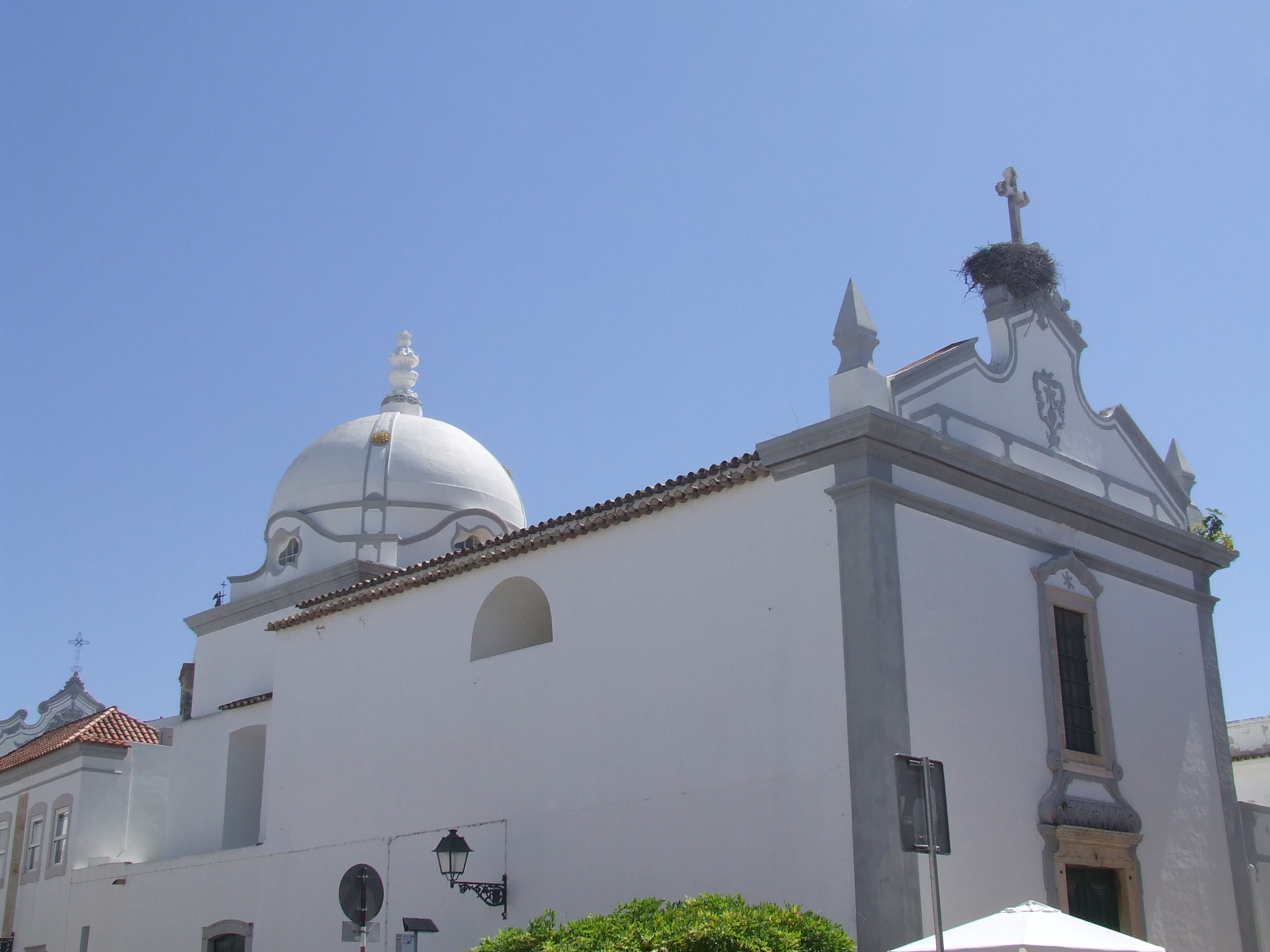
Church of Nossa Senhora da Soledade side elevation (west), showing dome

- Church of Nossa Senhora do Rosário (Portuguese: Igreja de Nossa Senhora do Rosário), constructed in the first-half of the 17th century, it became the centre of the parish when in 1695, Olhão was raised to the status of ecclesiastical parish. It was damaged during the 1755 Lisbon earthquake, but reconstructed during the intervening years to include five altars that included retables for Senhor dos Passos; Santa Clara; Santa Luzia and São Sebastião;
- Church of Nossa Senhora da Soledade (Portuguese: Igreja de Nossa Senhora da Soledade), built in the Baroque and Roccoco styles, the church was once the parochial church, but is primarily used as a pilgrimage chapel.
