= Armona Island =

Island in southern Portugal

Coordinates: 37.025°N 7.780°W

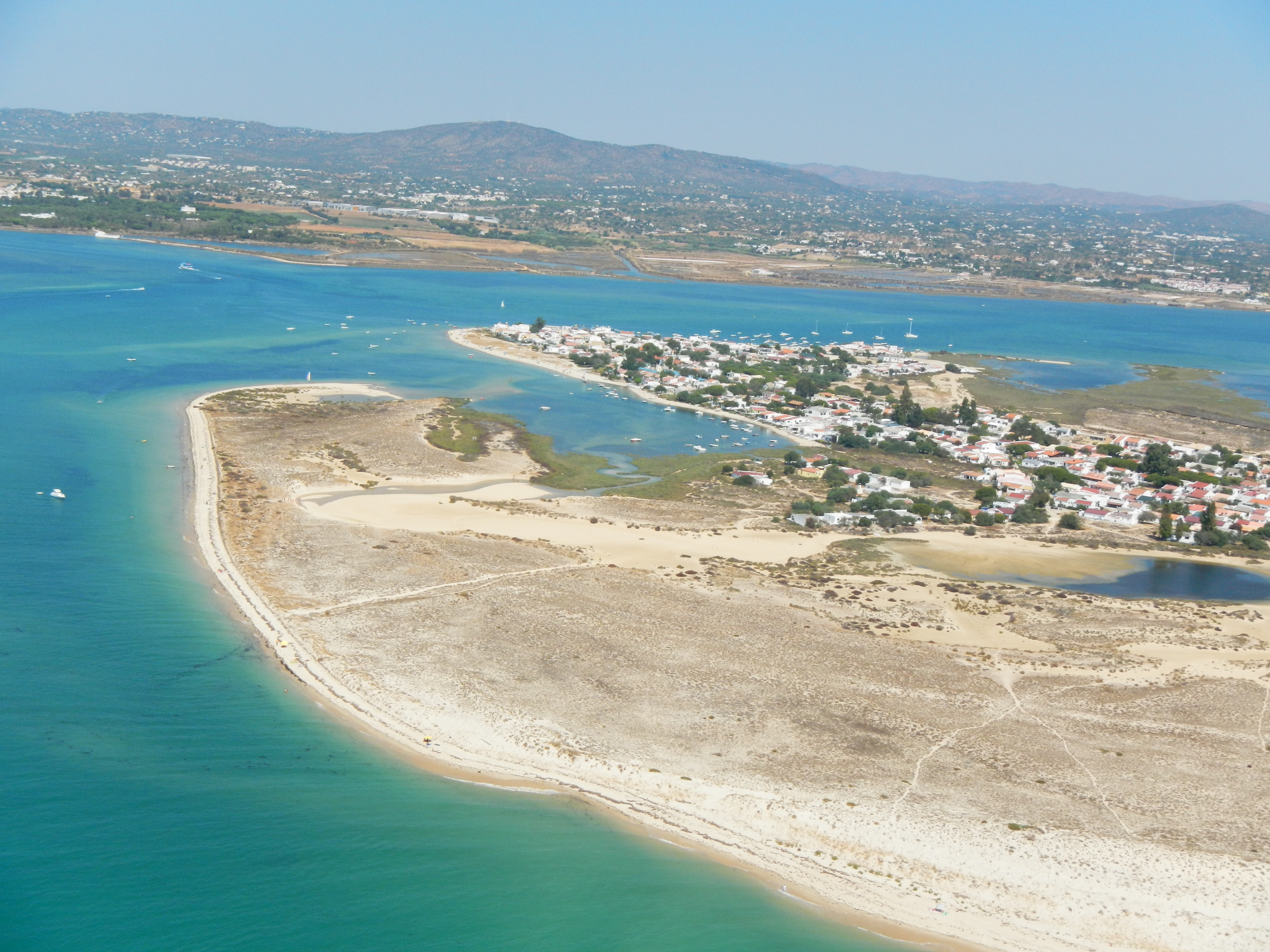
Armona Island facing Olhão

Armona Island is one of many islands of Algarve, Portugal. Armona is 9 kilometres (6 mi) in length, and from 0.1 to 1 km (0.1 to 0.6 mi) wide. It is accessible by regular 20-minute ferry trips or even quicker water taxi from the waterfront in Olhão. The island is populated with a large number of beach houses and 5 cafe bars. The main beach on the Atlantic side of the island is pristine and uncrowded, making it a popular daytrip destination for tourists staying in Olhão itself. The port is a very popular place in the summer when the locals and holiday makers dive / jump off it into the sea.

Opposite Armona Island, one can also find Fuseta Island (also known as Fuseta Island Beach), which is located in front of Fuseta and is accessible by ferry or water taxi.

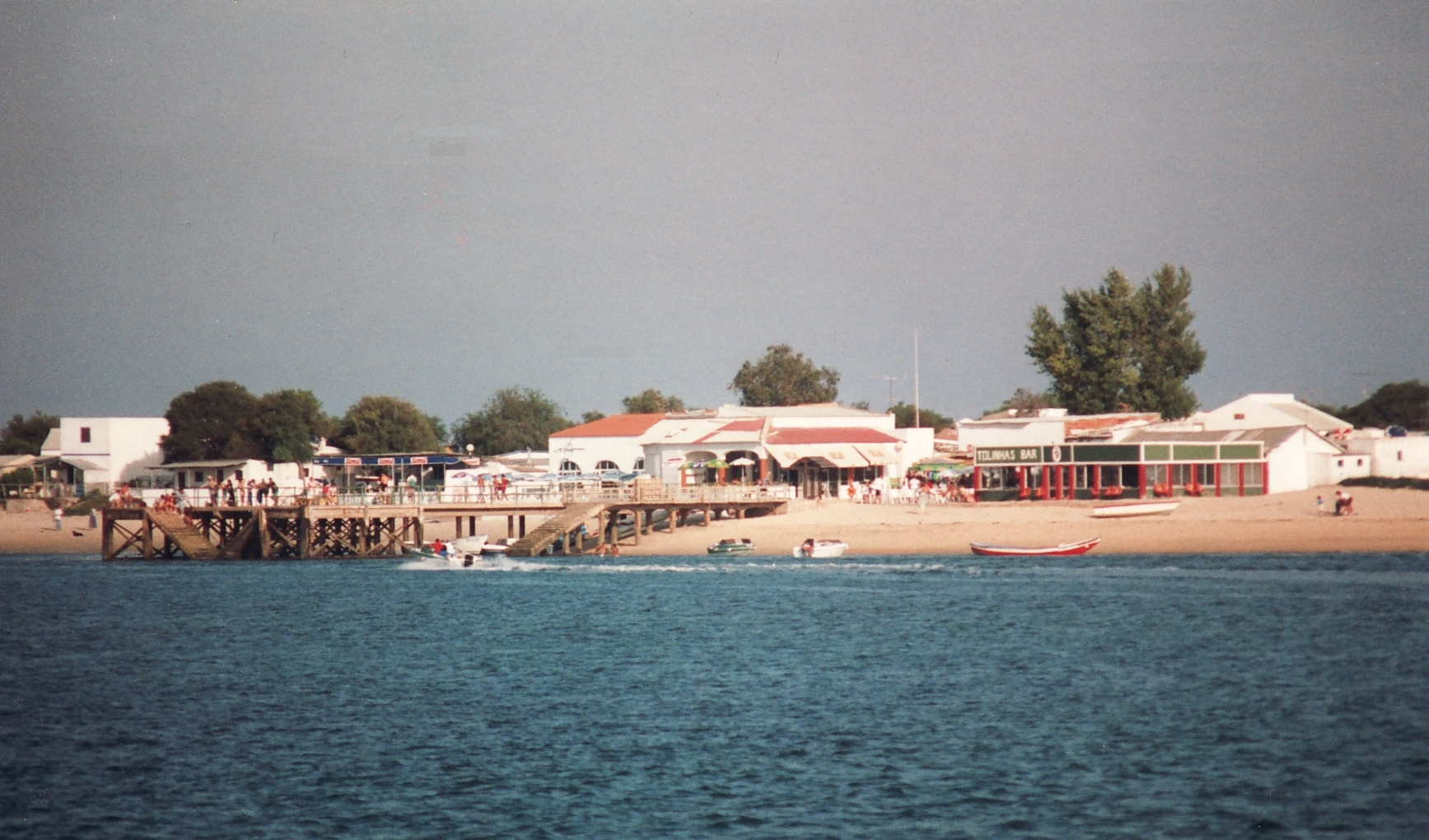
Armona Island in 1992.
