= Moncarapacho e Fuseta =

- Civil parish
- Location in Portugal
- Coordinates: 37.085°N 7.787°W
- Country: Portugal
- Region: Algarve
- Intermunic. comm.: Algarve
- District: Faro
- Municipality: Olhão

Area
  - Total: 70.63 km^{2} (27.27 sq mi)

Population (2011)
  - Total: 9,635
  - Density: 136.4/km^{2} (353.3/sq mi)
- Time zone: UTC+00:00 (WET)
  - Summer (DST): UTC+01:00 (WEST)

Moncarapacho e Fuseta is a civil parish in the municipality of Olhão, Portugal. It was formed in 2013 by the merger of the former parishes Moncarapacho and Fuseta. The population in 2011 was 9,635, in an area of 70.63 km².
