= Quelfes =

- Civil parish
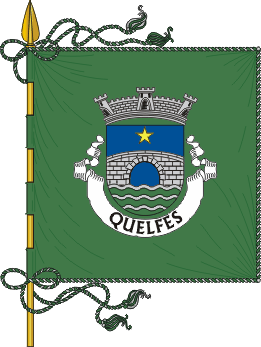
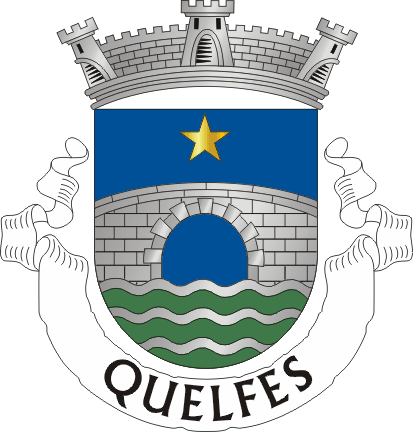
- Flag Coat of arms

- Location in Portugal
- Coordinates: 37.057°N 7.822°W
- Country: Portugal
- Region: Algarve
- Intermunic. comm.: Algarve
- District: Faro
- Municipality: Olhão

Area
  - Total: 28.20 km^{2} (10.89 sq mi)

Population (2011)
  - Total: 17,246
  - Density: 611.6/km^{2} (1,584/sq mi)
- Time zone: UTC+00:00 (WET)
  - Summer (DST): UTC+01:00 (WEST)
- Website: http://www.jfquelfes.eu/

Quelfes is a freguesia (parish) in the municipality of Olhão (Algarve, Portugal). The population in 2011 was 17,246, in an area of 28.20 km².

== Main sites ==
- Quelfes Church
- Quelfes' Roman bridge
