= Olhão =

Olhão Olhão da Restauração
- Municipality
- City of Olhão da Restauração
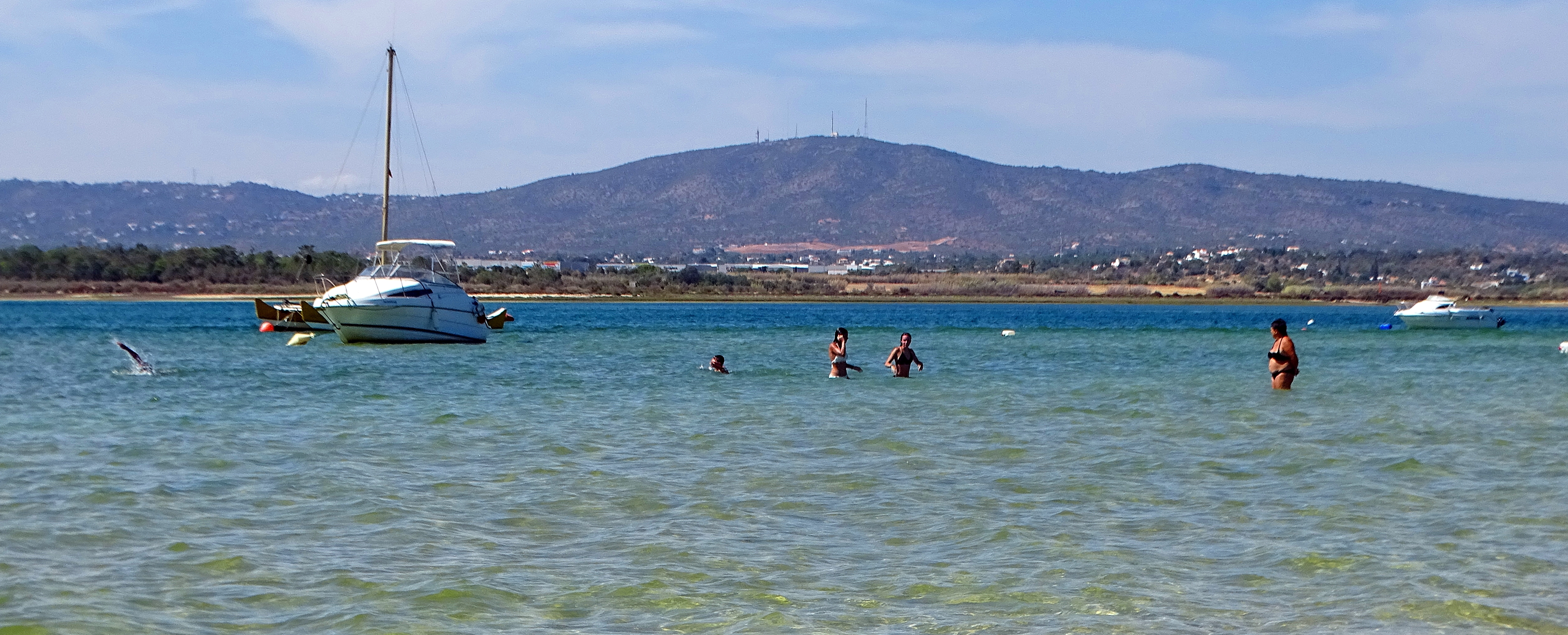
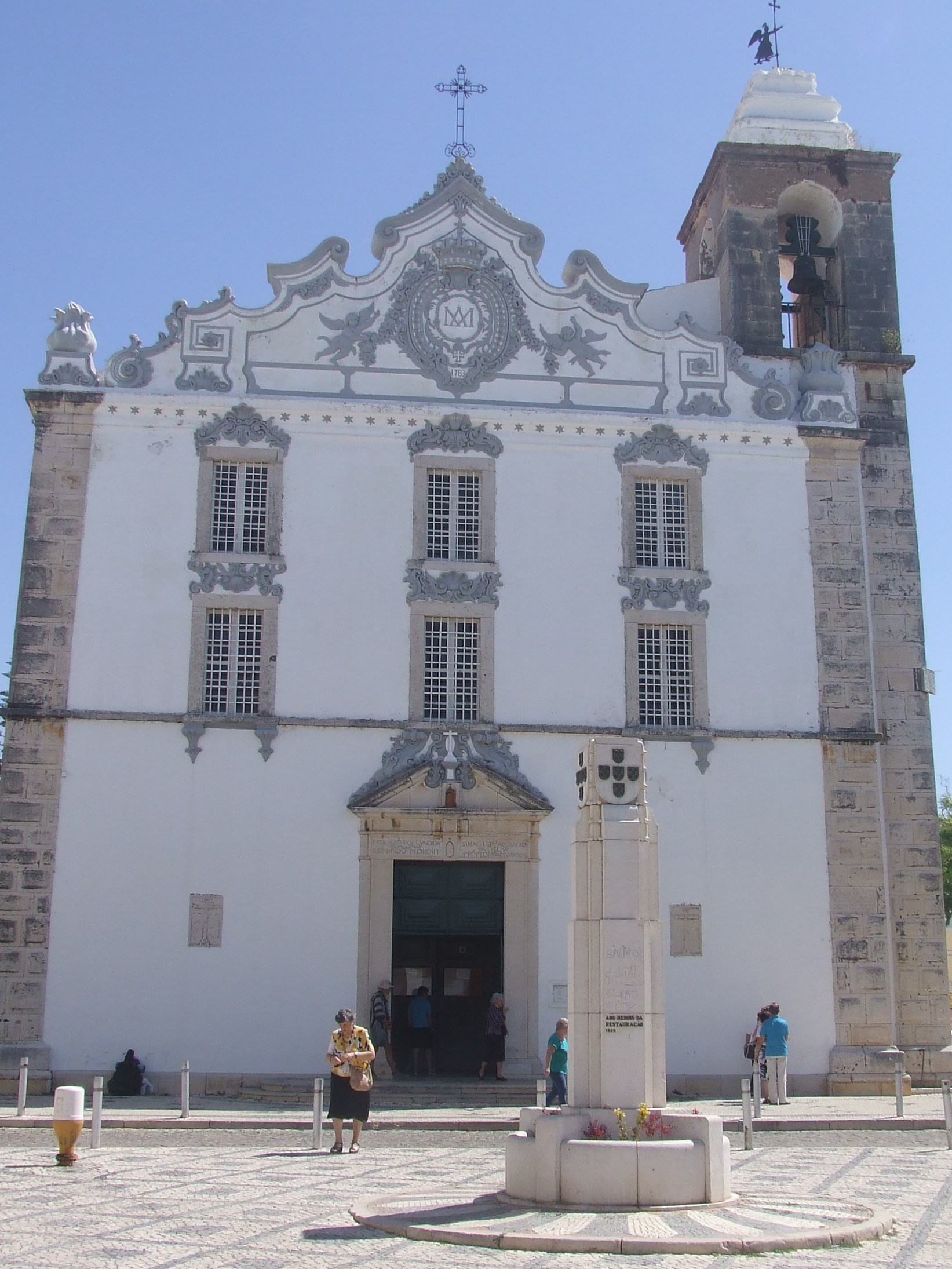
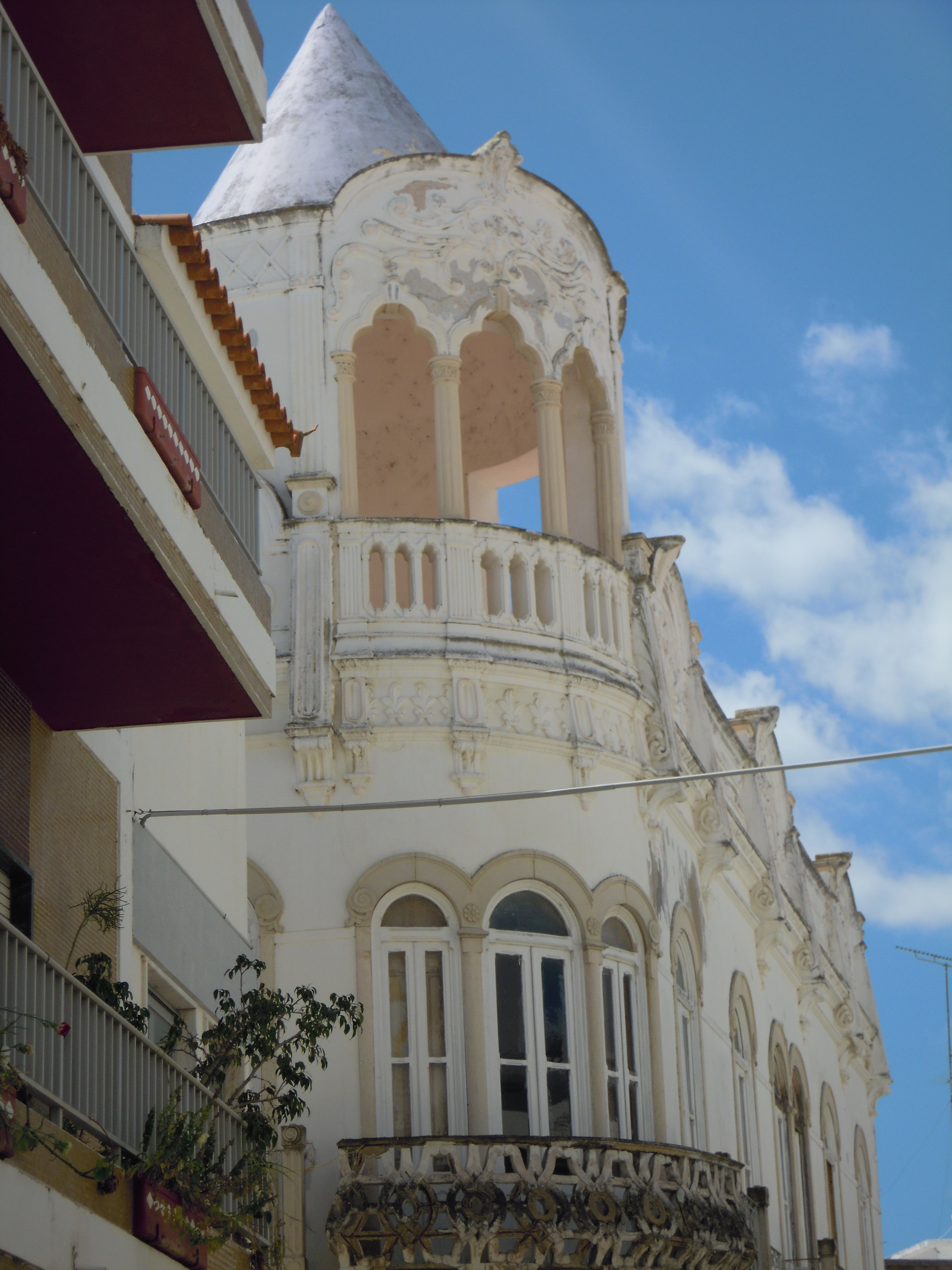
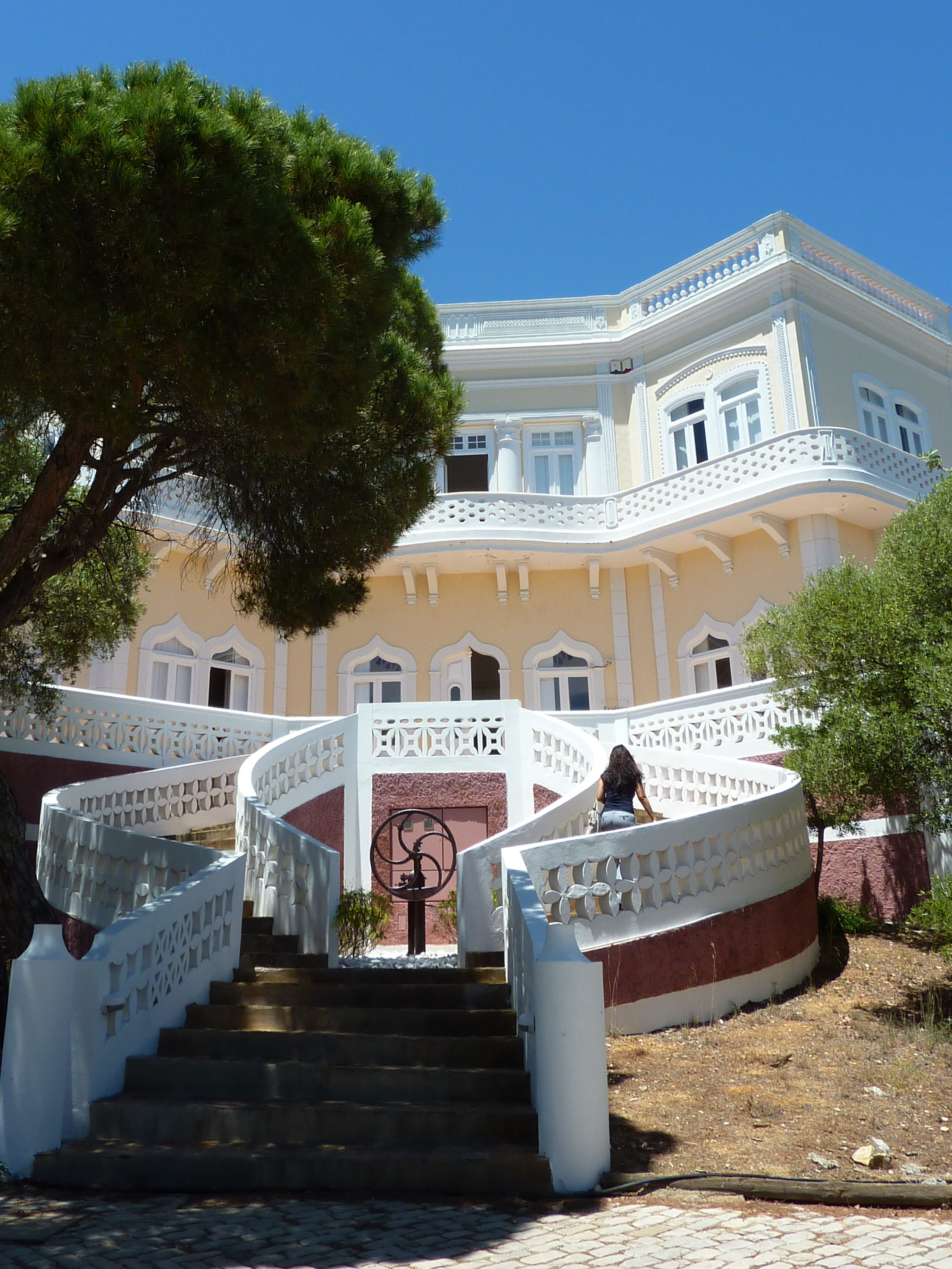
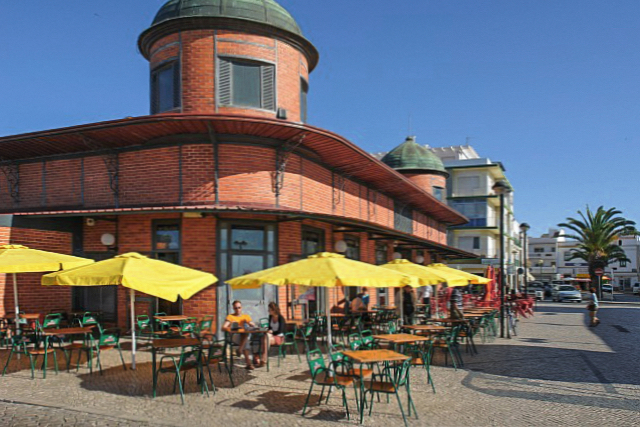
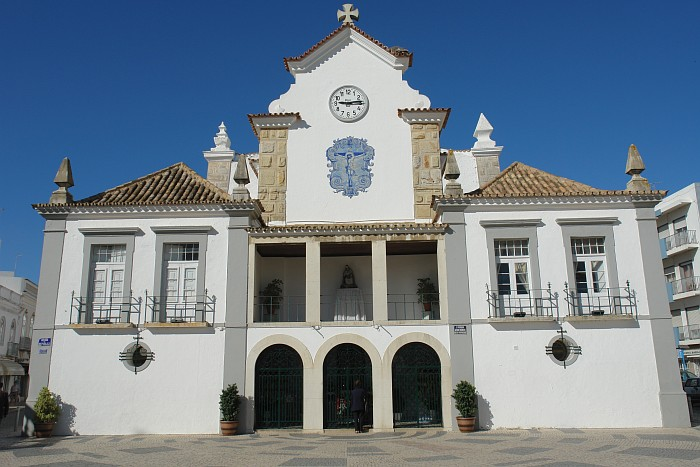

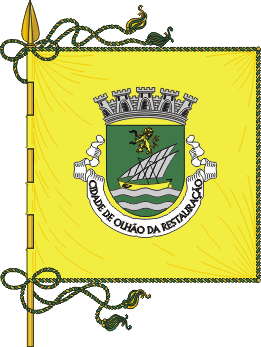
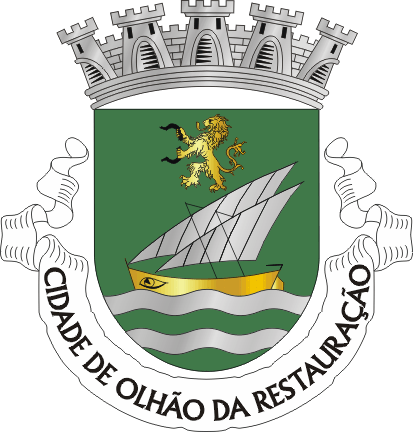
- Flag Coat of arms
- Interactive map of Olhão
- Coordinates: 37°1′30″N 7°50′30″W
- Country: Portugal
- Region: Algarve
- Intermunic. comm.: Algarve
- District: Faro
- Parishes: 4

Government
  - President: António Pina (PS)

Area
  - Total: 130.86 km^{2} (50.53 sq mi)
- Highest elevation: 403 m (1,322 ft)
- Lowest elevation: 0 m (0 ft)

Population (2011)
  - Total: 45,396
  - Density: 346.91/km^{2} (898.48/sq mi)
- Time zone: UTC+00:00 (WET)
  - Summer (DST): UTC+01:00 (WEST)
- Postal code: 8700
- Area code: 289
- Website: http://www.cm-olhao.pt

Olhão, (Note: European Portuguese pronunciation: [ɔˈʎɐ̃w]) officially the City of Olhão da Restauração, is a city and municipality in the Algarve region of southern Portugal. The population of the municipality in 2011 was 45,396, in an area of 130.86 km^{2} (50.53 sq mi). Located near the regional capital Faro and forming a single urban agglomeration, it is a fishing port and tourist center. Along with Faro, Loulé and Tavira, Olhão forms a conurbation from the eastern and central Algarve.

== History ==
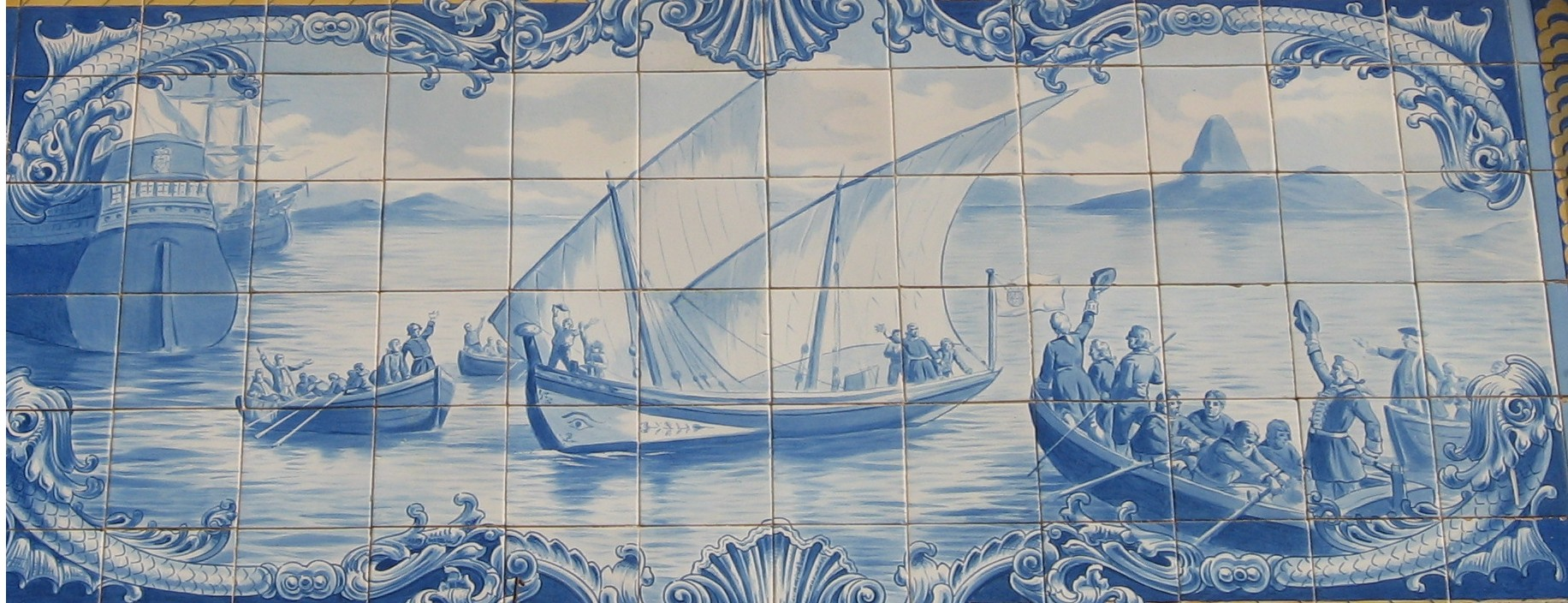
An azulejo depicting the famous trip to Brazil of representatives of the revolt against the French occupation

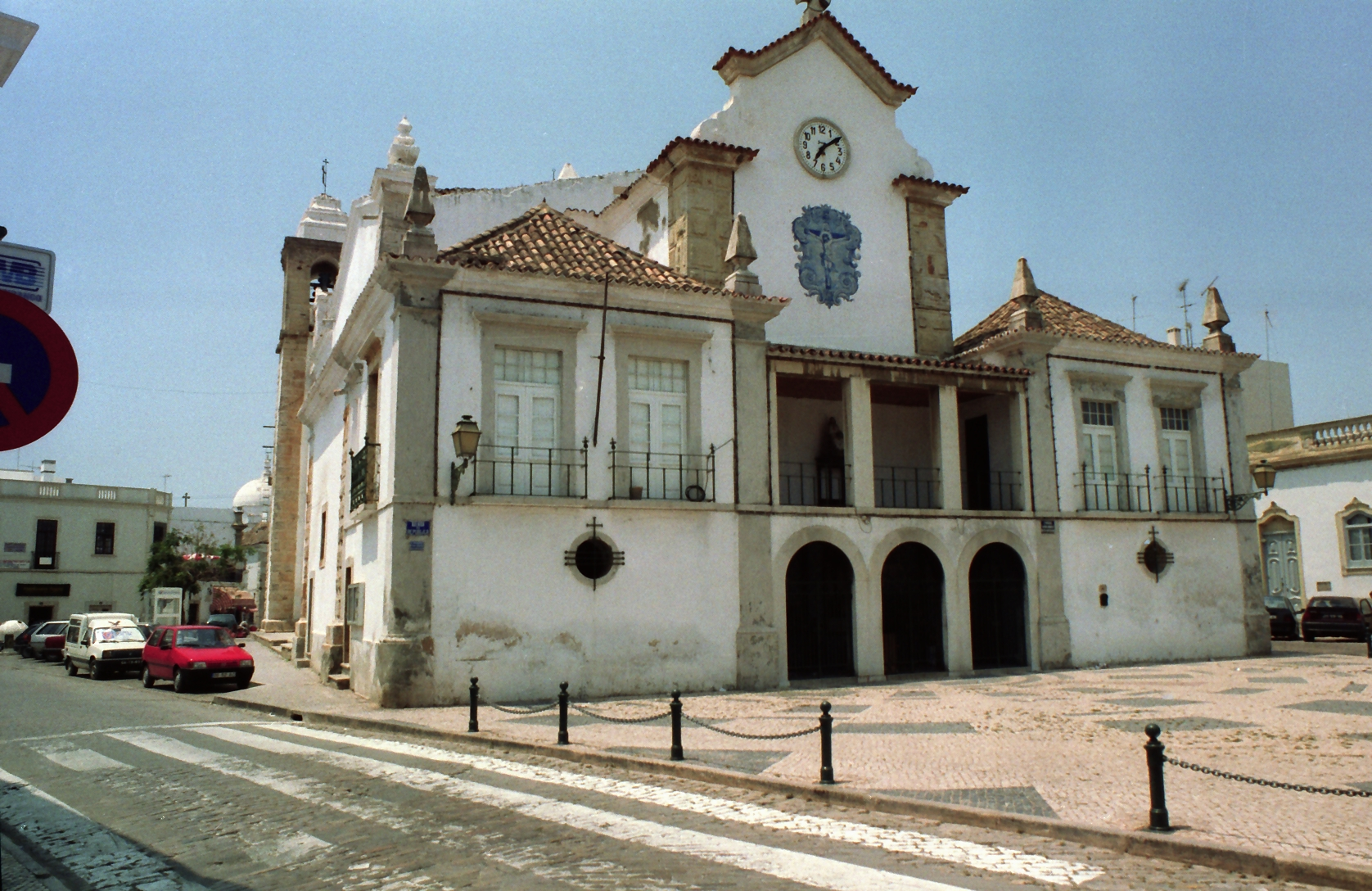
The Chapel of Senhor dos Aflitos at the rear of the Church of Nossa Senhora do Rosário in the parish of Olhão

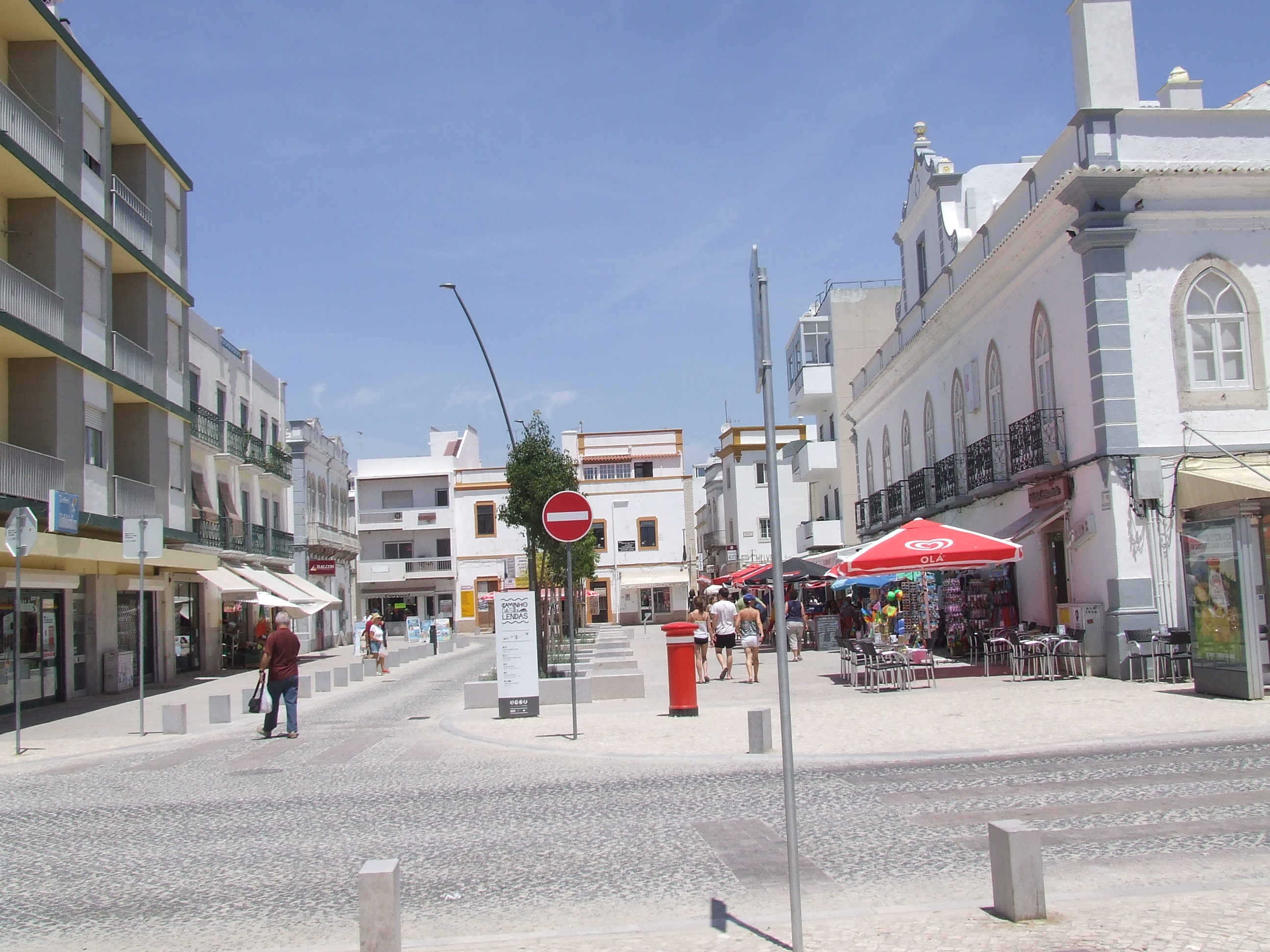
Praça Patrão Joaquim Lopes. The plaza in front of the two market houses.

Since pre-history, Olhão has had vestiges of human occupation, although the oldest written record dates only from 1378, referring to a place called Olham. The estuary and abundance of water were decisive factors that influenced fishermen, at the beginning of the 17th century, to congregate along the beach of Olhão. The settlement developed even as officials in Faro discouraged concentration along this coast. Yet, after the middle of the 17th century, growth was driven by the protection offered by the Fort of São Lourenço do Bugio, which guarded the coast and entrance to the estuary, discouraging attacks from corsairs.

The incremental growth of the fishery along the coast and sea, and commercial enterprises associated their growth, provoked a leap in population. As a result, in 1695, the residents requested from the Bishop of Faro, that Olhão should be de-annexed from the parish of Quelfes: resulting in the formation of the parish of Nossa Senhora do Rosário de Olhão.

During the French occupation of the Algarve, during the Peninsular Wars, Olhão was notable for one of the few public uprisings against the occupiers, occurring on 16 June 1808. This revolt culminated in the expulsion of the French from Olhão and, as a result, from the rest of the Algarve. It was during this period, that a month later, a small group of 17 men embarked to Brazil, a Portuguese territory in South America where the king was living due to the French invasion, on a caique (a small sailing vessel) named Bom Sucesso, in the hope of promoting the Algarvean success to the Portuguese Court. The crew brought an ex-official statement describing the audacious attitude of the Olhanese revolt. A replica of the boat is moored at Olhão's waterfront.

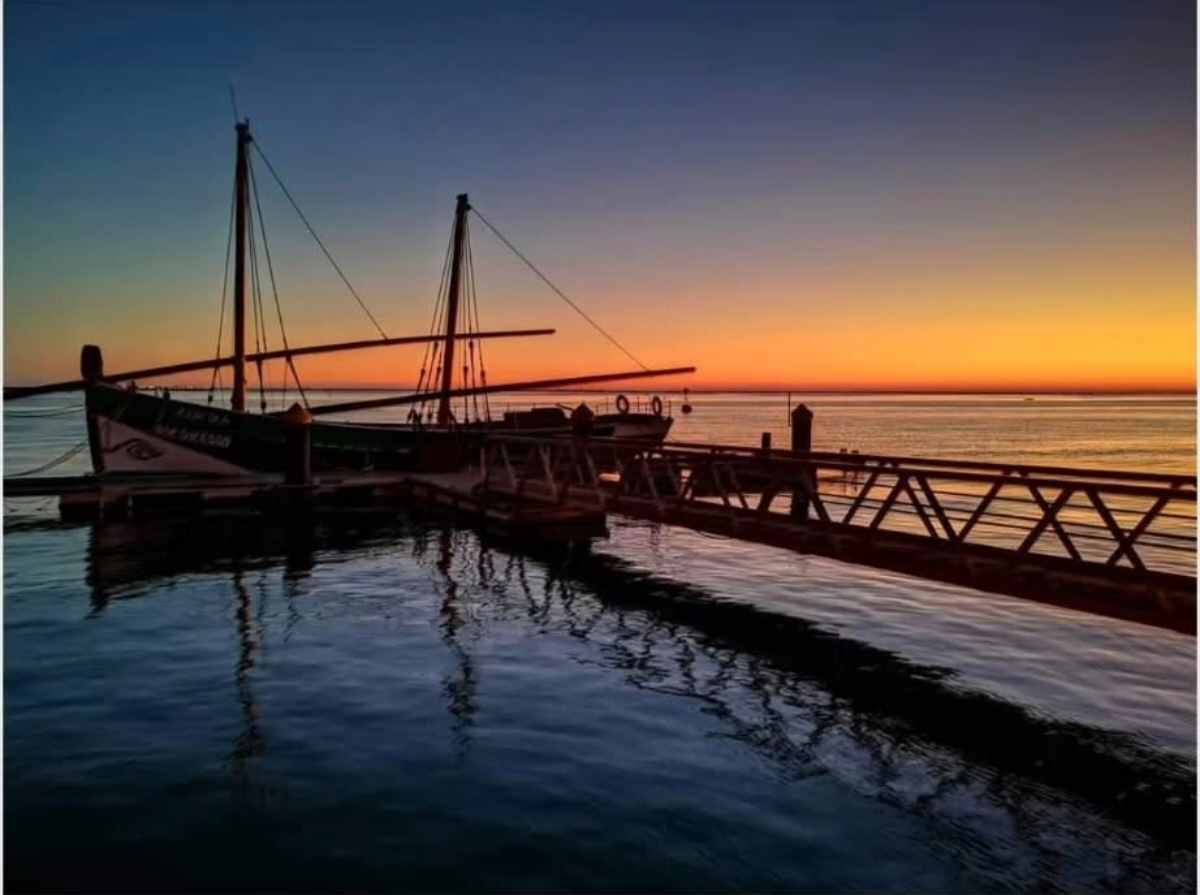
Caíque Bom Sucesso Olhão (P)

In recompense, a regal charter (with the force of law) was signed by the Prince Regent John to distinguish Olhão, and its inhabitants, transforming the location from a locality to town, and ordering that it be referred to as Vila de Olhão da Restauração. The transformation, resulted in the creation of a new municipality, with local autonomy, beginning in 1826. In this year, the municipal council hall was erected and a juiz de fora was instituted to preside over the councilmen.

In 1835, the parish of Moncarapacho began to function as a suburb of Olhão, and in the following year, the municipal council took control of the parishes of Olhão, Quelfes, Pechão and part of Moncarapacho.

A judicial division of Portugal in 1874, resulted in the definitive demarcation of the municipality of Olhão, constituted by the five parishes of Olhão, Moncarapacho, Quelfes, Pechão and Fuseta.

Over time the small town of fishermen grew into an economic, social and urban centre, resulting in its elevation in city in 1985. In recent years, it has also developed a growing tourist industry.

== Geography ==
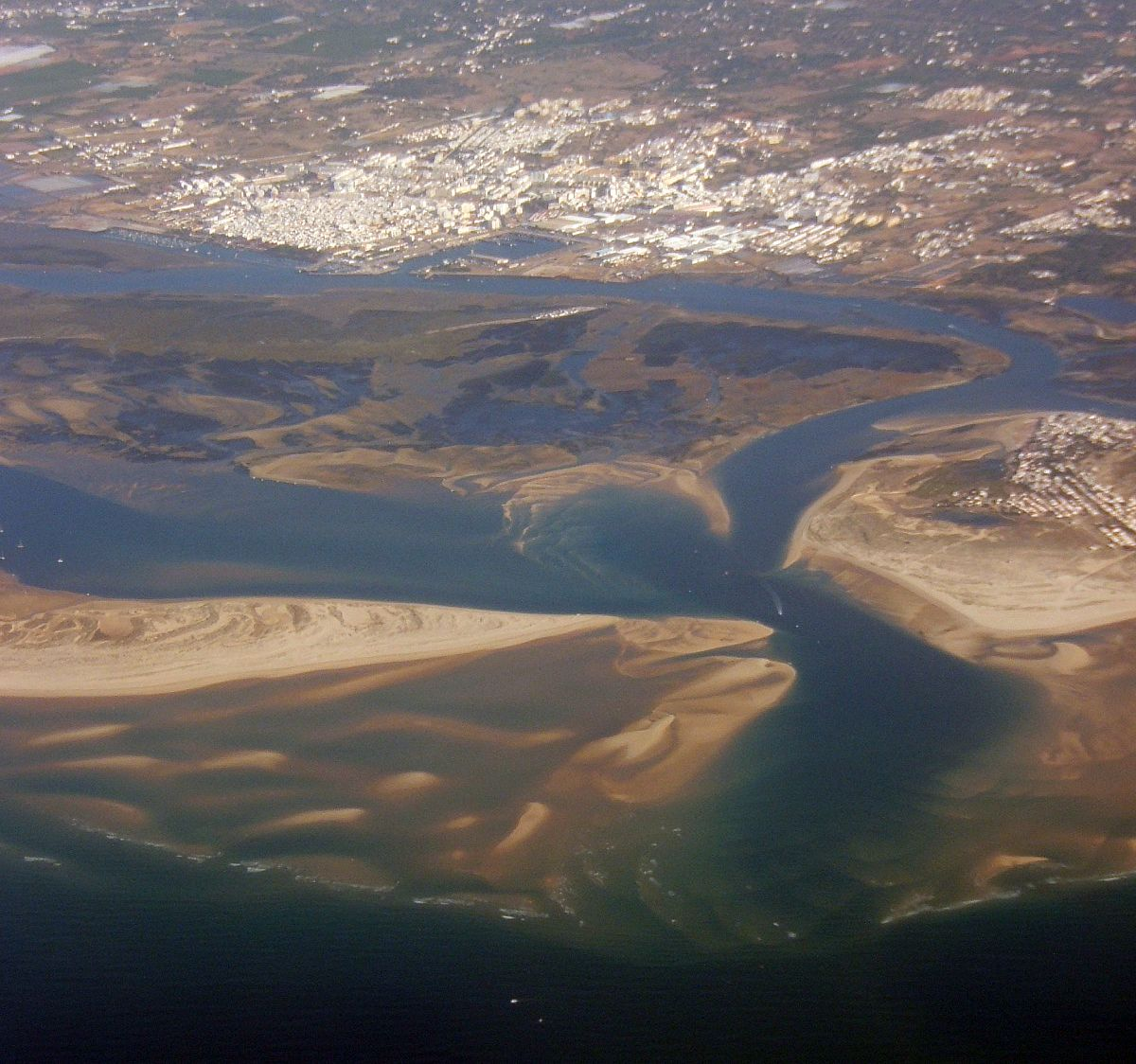
An aerial view of the western frontier of Olhão and urban area

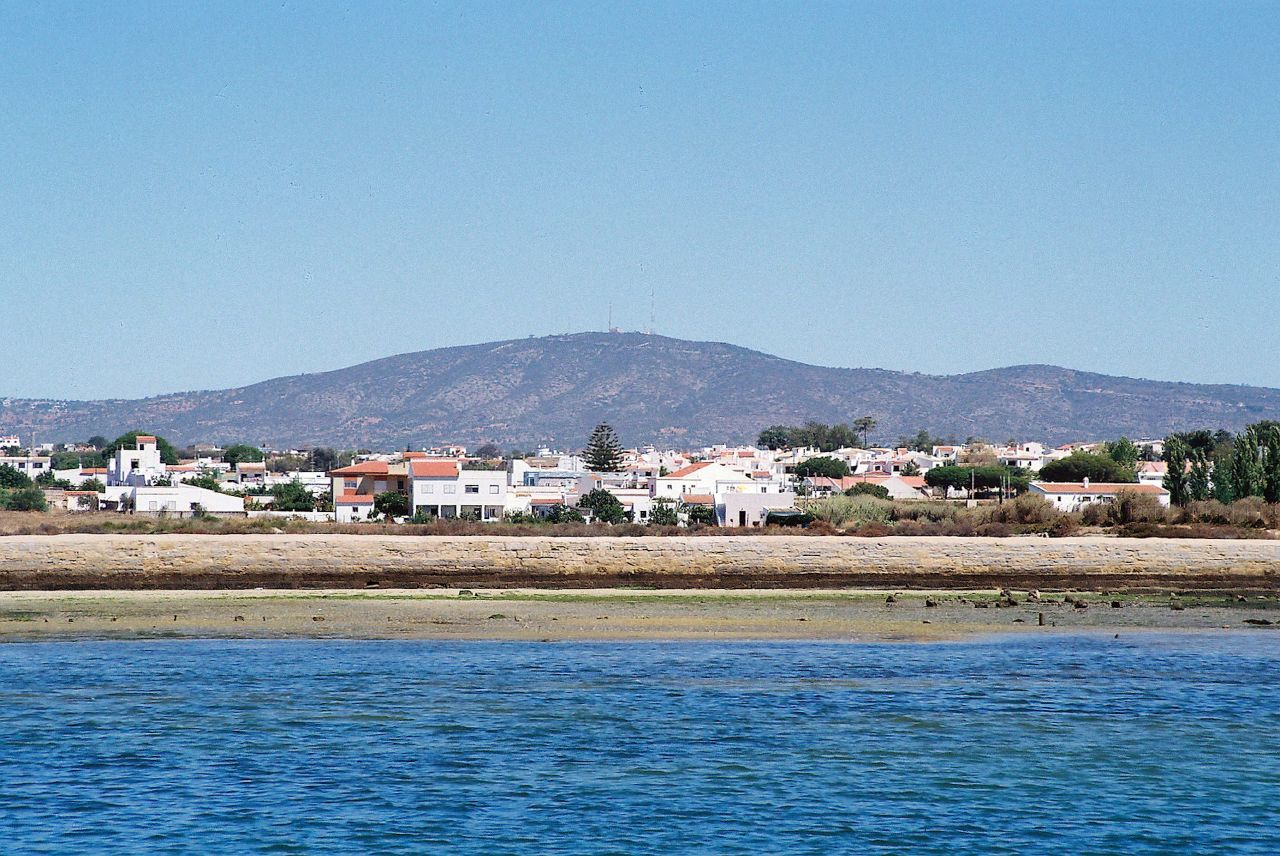
A glimpse of the coastal community of Olhão, overshadowed by Monte de São Miguel

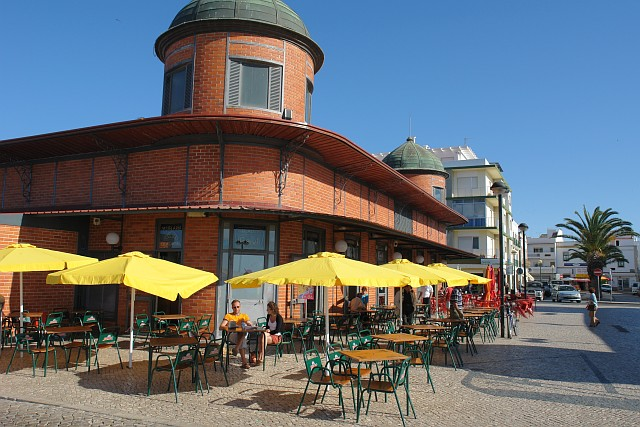
The marketplace in the centre of the municipality

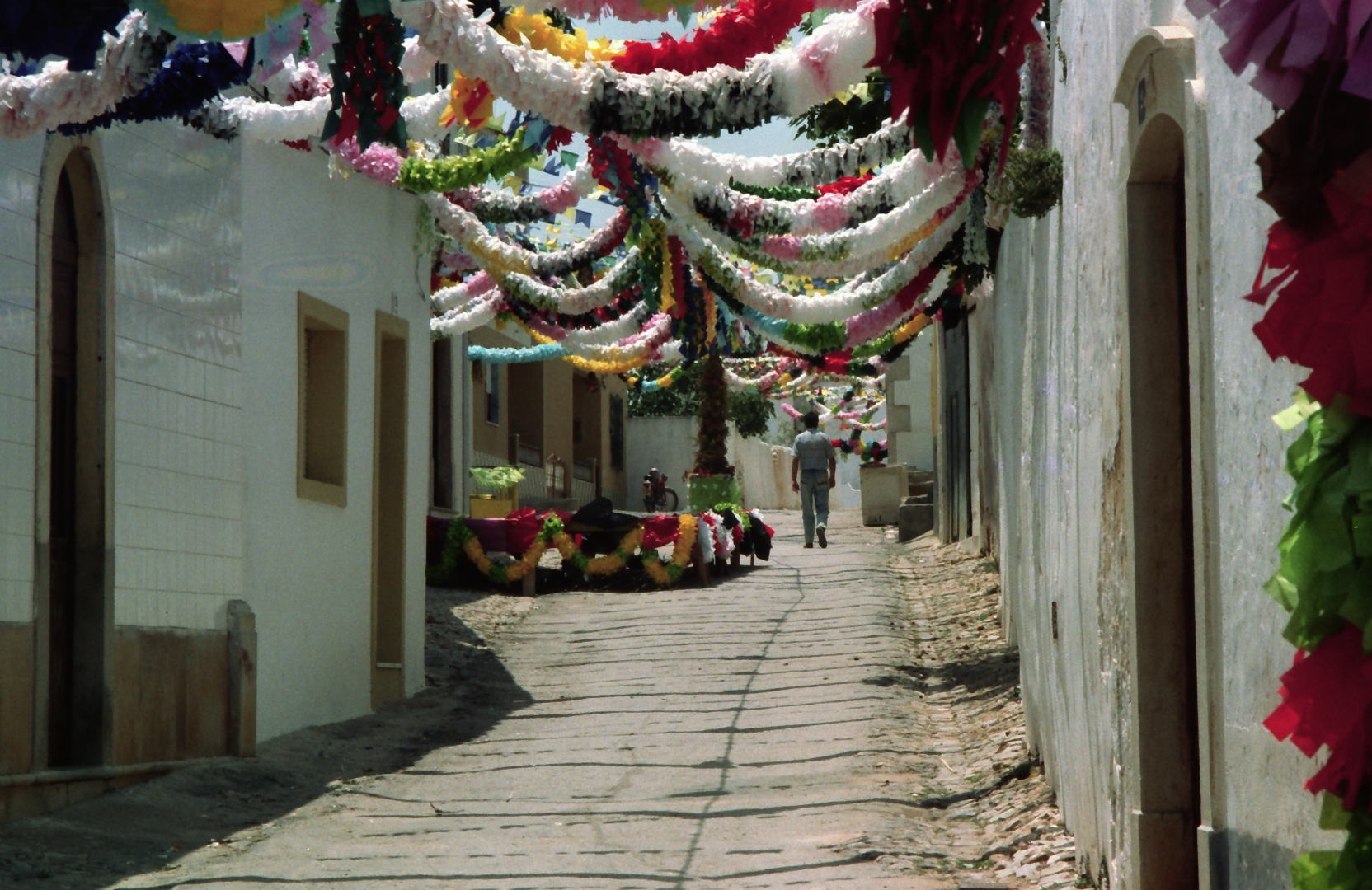
A street in the civil parish of Moncarapacho

=== Physical geography ===
The municipality is confronted on the east and north by the municipality of Tavira, to the west by the municipality of Faro and in the south by the Atlantic Ocean. It is located within the morphological sub-regions of the Barrocal and coast. In the Barrocal, the municipality is limited in the north by the old massif and south with the sand-stones of the Mesozoic. These lines follow an ancient beach and coast, justifying the existence of the sedimentary deposits (sand-stones) over the ancient massif. The coast, constituted by a sub-zone of more recent materials, Quaternary or Neogenic in age. These deposits came to rest over sand-stones and marls that comprise the coastal Mesocenozoic, a young relief, that is little accented, aided by a platform that includes superficial lavas.

=== Ecoregions/protected areas ===
All of the coastal littoral of the municipality belongs to the Nature Park of Ria Formosa, one of the more important humid zones in Europe, considered in 2004, by International Union for Conservation of Nature (IUCN) as a humid zone of world interest.

The Nature Park of Ria Formosa was instituted in 1987, by Decree Law 373/87 (9 September), with the objective of protecting and conserving this river system, and in particular the flora and fauna, including species of migratory bird and their habitats. The Nature Park extends into the municipalities of Loulé, Faro, Olhão, Tavira and Vila Real de Santo António, covering an area of 18400 hectares, for 60 kilometres (37 mi) along the coast, from Ancão until Manta Rota, covering a great variety of habitats: barrier islands, marshes, banks of mud and sand, dunes, salt marshes, freshwater ponds and brackish waterways, forests and agricultural areas.

In the municipality of Olhão, the island of Armona is included in the barrier islands of the Ria Formosa: this includes the beaches of Fuseta Mar and Armona Mar.

=== Climate ===
The Algarve is an area that presents a climate typically Mediterranean, characterized by warm summers during five months of the year, with median daily temperatures around 22.5 °C and gentle winters, with scarce precipitation and daily median temperatures around 12.4 °C.

In a general way, the municipality presents a temperate humid Mediterranean climate, with warm, dry summers and mild winters. The precipitation is distributed in an irregular fashion throughout the year, while concentrating in the months between autumn and spring. The climate is not homogeneously distributed throughout the region; the maritime influence gives way from the littoral area to the interior, turning the climate warmer and drier, and simultaneously more rainy.

=== Human geography ===
Population of Olhão (1849 - 2011)
Year	Pop.	±%
1849	11,934	—
1900	24,276	+103.4%
1930	27,664	+14.0%
1960	30,871	+11.6%
1981	34,573	+12.0%
1991	36,812	+6.5%
2001	40,808	+10.9%
2011	45,396	+11.2%

The municipality of Olhão has an area of approximately 130.9 square kilometres (50.5 mi^{2}), with a resident population that includes 42,272 inhabitants (approximately 31,100 within the city of Olhão). Olhão is divided into an interior territory and the island of Armona.

Administratively, the municipality is divided into 4 civil parishes (freguesias):

- Moncarapacho e Fuseta
- Olhão
- Pechão
- Quelfes

== Economy ==
Olhão is a fishing port and a center for industrial fish and seafood processing, home to the Bela brand of canned sardines and Conserveira do Sul's Manná range of processed fish and seafood products which also include canned sardines and a wide range of other products such as fish and seafood pastes. The city is also an important tourist destination of coastal Algarve and plays a role as a tourist accommodation, logistics and transportation hub for the Ria Formosa islands located in front of the city, namely the Armona Island and the Culatra Island. The annual seafood festival of Olhão is a major attraction in the city every year.

== Sports ==
Olhão is home to Sporting Clube Olhanense whose main football team plays in the Estadio José Arcanjo, a multi-purpose stadium in the city that holds 11,622 spectators and was built in 1984.

== Notable people ==
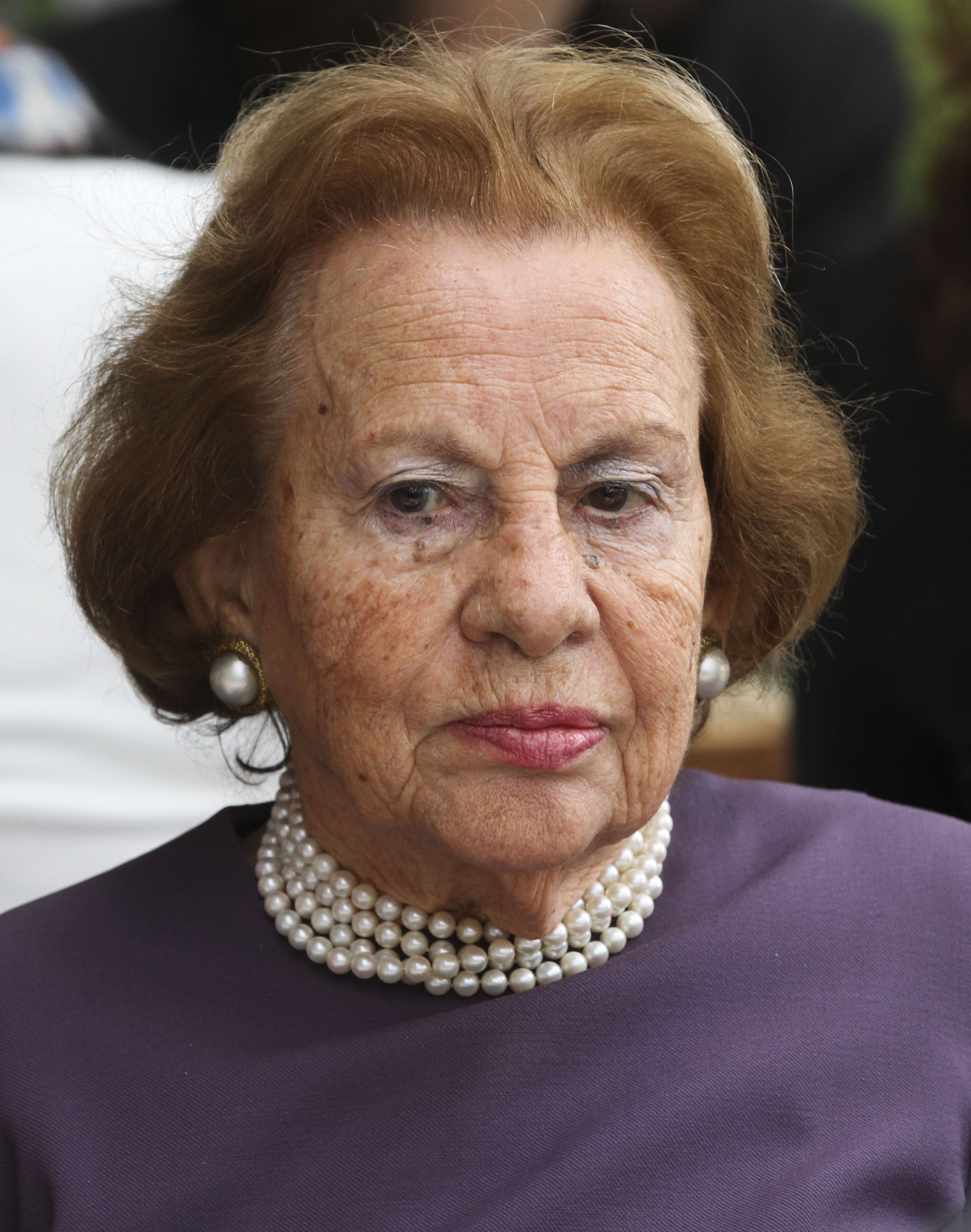
Maria Barroso, 2013

- Alberto Iria (1909–1992) a Portuguese historian, a specialist in the history of the Algarve
- Maria Barroso (1925–2015) a politician and actress, wife of President of Portugal Mario Soares and First Lady of Portugal 1986-1996
- João Arménio Correia Martins (born 1951) scientist in computational mechanics, developed the compliance friction law
- Mário Centeno (born 1966) an economist, university professor, politician and Minister of Finance (2015–2020)
- Júlio Resende (born 1982) a pianist, composer, jazz musician and bandleader

=== Sport ===
- João Paulo Brito (born 1974), a retired footballer with 230 club caps
- Ruben Faria (born 1974), a rally-raid and enduro motorcycle rider
- Vasco Fernandes (born 1986), a footballer of Guinea-Bissauan descent with over 300 club caps
- Gonçalo Ramos (born 2001), a Portuguese professional footballer who plays as a forward for Serie A club AC Milan.
- Gonçalo Fernandes, son of Manchester United Captain Bruno Fernandes

== See also ==
- S.C. Olhanense
