= Moncarapacho =

- Civil parish
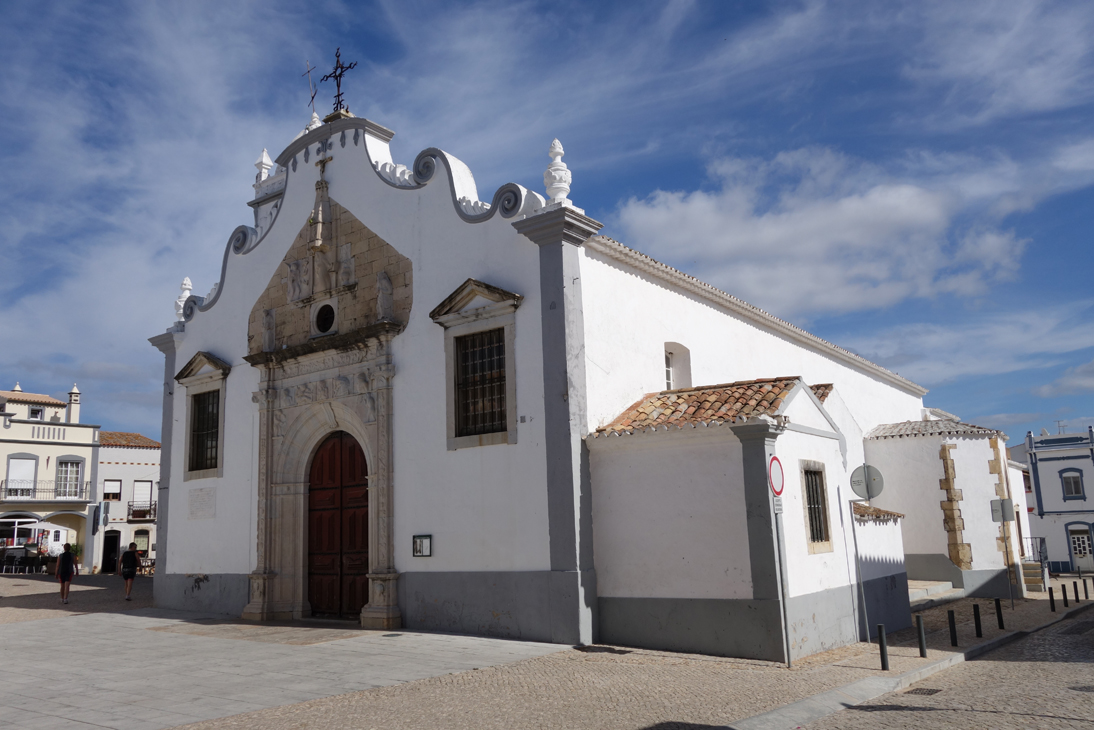

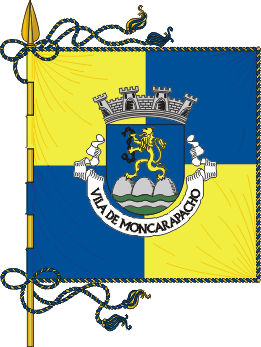
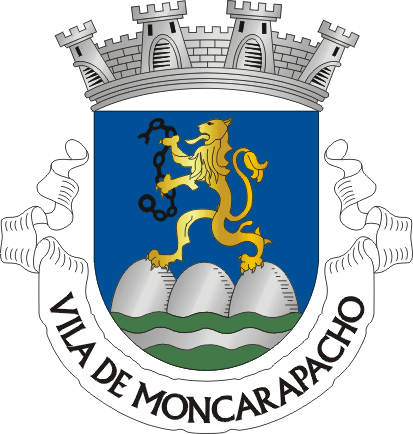
- Flag Coat of arms

- Location in Portugal
- Coordinates: 37°05′N 7°47′W
- Country: Portugal
- Region: Algarve
- Intermunic. comm.: Algarve
- District: Faro
- Municipality: Olhão
- Disbanded: 2013

Area
  - Total: 75.19 km^{2} (29.03 sq mi)

Population (2001)
  - Total: 7,591
  - Density: 101.0/km^{2} (261.5/sq mi)
- Time zone: UTC+00:00 (WET)
  - Summer (DST): UTC+01:00 (WEST)

Moncarapacho is a former civil parish in the municipality of Olhão, Portugal. In 2013, the parish merged into the new parish Moncarapacho e Fuseta.

== Main sites ==
- Moncarapacho Church
