= Cacela =

Cacela may refer to:

- Vila Nova de Cacela, a civil parish of the municipality of Vila Real de Santo António, Algarve, Portugal.
- Cacela Island, a peninsula located in the same civil parish.
- Cacela Velha, a village also located in the same civil parish.
