= 2011 D.C. United Women season =

D.C. United Women
2011 season
- General manager: Chris Hummer
- Head coach: Mike Jorden
- Stadium: Maryland SoccerPlex
- W-League: Division: 2nd Conference: 4th Overall: 8th
- U.S. National Women's Cup: Did not enter
- W-League Playoffs: Did not qualify
- Top goalscorer: Christine Nairn; Christie Welsh (3 goals)
- Highest home attendance: 1,052 vs. NJV
- Lowest home attendance: 585 vs. NJR
- Average home league attendance: 803
| Home colors | Away colors |

The 2011 season was the inaugural season of the D.C. United Women. For the 2011 season, D.C. United Women played in the W-League, the second tier of women's professional soccer in the United States and Canada, specifically in the Northeast Division of the Eastern Conference.

United began the season on May 25 and concluded the regular season on July 10. They won their first match against the New York Magic 3–0 with goals by Christine Nairn and Bri Hovington. The team finished the regular season with a 5-3-2 record, tied on points for second place in the division with the New Jersey Wildcats. However, they lost the tiebreaker on head-to-head competition and therefore fell short of making the W-League playoffs.

== Match results ==
=== W-League ===
The D.C. United Women played their inaugural match against New Jersey fielding a lineup which featured two former USWNT players.

| May 25, 2011 1 | New Jersey Wildcats | 1–0 | D.C. United Women | Ewing Township, NJ |
| 19:30 EDT | Rossi 88' | Report | | Stadium: TCNJ Lions Stadium; Referee: Rafal Siudzik |

| June 5, 2011 2 | New York Magic | 0–3 | D.C. United Women | New Rochelle, NY |
| 16:00 EDT | | Report | 5', 66' Nairn; 50' Hovington | Stadium: Mazzella Field; Referee: Brian Dunn |

| June 9, 2011 3 | D.C. United Women | 1–1 | New Jersey Wildcats | Boyds, MD |
| 19:00 EDT | Welsh 79' (yellow card) 90'; Cummins (yellow card) 83' | Report | Lopez 79' (red card) 90' | Stadium: Maryland SoccerPlex; Attendance: 624; Referee: Angela Ianni |

| June 12, 2011 4 | North Jersey Valkyries | 2–1 | D.C. United Women | Wayne, NJ |
| 12:00 EDT | Tirelli 15'; Schulmann 28'; Abrue (yellow card) 85' | Report | 29' Porto | Stadium: DePaul Catholic Stadium; Attendance: 225; Referee: Neil Barbulescu |

| June 18, 2011 5 | Long Island Rough Riders | 2–0 | D.C. United Women | South Huntington, NY |
| 17:00 EDT | Derosa 18'; Greene 69' | Report | | Stadium: Cy Donnelly Stadium; Attendance: 288; Referee: Sean O’Neil |

| June 19, 2011 6 | New Jersey Rangers | 1–1 | D.C. United Women | Denville, NJ |
| 15:00 EDT | Urniasz 56' | Report | 44' Watson | Stadium: MCHS Crusaders Stadium; Attendance: 179; Referee: Gary Beaulore |

| June 19, 2011 7 | D.C. United Women | 2–0 | New York Magic | Boyds, MD |
| 19:00 EDT | Brown 35'; Nairn 79' | Report | (yellow card) 90' Westhof | Stadium: Maryland SoccerPlex; Attendance: 823; Referee: Brian Coleman |

| June 30, 2011 8 | D.C. United Women | 2–1 | Long Island Rough Riders | Boyds, MD |
| 15:00 EDT | Welsh 12'; Clayton 46' | Report | 66' Leaverton | Stadium: Maryland SoccerPlex; Attendance: 932; Referee: Ron Harnage |

| July 8, 2011 9 | D.C. United Women | 3–1 | New Jersey Rangers | Boyds, MD |
| 19:00 EDT | Siegel 63'; Welsh 65'; Herndon 66' | Report | 26' Hayes | Stadium: Maryland SoccerPlex; Attendance: 585; Referee: Angela Ianni |

| July 10, 2011 10 | D.C. United Women | 2–0 | North Jersey Valkyries | Boyds, MD |
| 17:00 EDT | DeWolfe 40'; Siegel 69' | Report | (yellow card) 68' Mihok | Stadium: Maryland SoccerPlex; Attendance: 1,052; Referee: Matthew Kreitzer |

== W-League ==
=== Standings ===
Division

| Pos | Club | Pld | W | L | T | GF | GA | GD | Pts |
|---|---|---|---|---|---|---|---|---|---|
| 1 | Long Island Rough Riders | 9 | 6 | 1 | 2 | 25 | 6 | 19 | 20 |
| 2 | New Jersey Wildcats | 10 | 5 | 1 | 3 | 13 | 7 | 6 | 17^{1} |
| 3 | D.C. United Women | 10 | 5 | 3 | 2 | 15 | 9 | 6 | 17 |
| 4 | New York Magic | 9 | 3 | 5 | 1 | 13 | 17 | -4 | 10 |
| 5 | North Jersey Valkyries | 8 | 2 | 3 | 3 | 13 | 12 | 1 | 9 |
| 6 | New Jersey Rangers | 9 | 0 | 8 | 1 | 4 | 32 | -28 | 1 |

^{1}New Jersey were deducted one point for roster violations

=== Results by round ===
| Round | 1 | 2 | 3 | 4 | 5 | 6 | 7 | 8 | 9 | 10 |
|---|---|---|---|---|---|---|---|---|---|---|
| Stadium | A | A | H | A | A | A | H | H | H | H |
| Division | 5 | 3 | 4 | 5 | 5 | 5 | 4 | 4 | 3 | 3 |
| Conference | 8 | 5 | 6 | 8 | 10 | 9 | 7 | 7 | 6 | 5 |
| Overall | 14 | 18 | 16 | 20 | 23 | 18 | 15 | 12 | 10 | 9 |

Updated to match(es) played on July 12, 2011. Source:
A = Away; H = Home

== Club ==
=== Roster ===
As of June 6, 2011

Note: Flags indicate national team as defined under FIFA eligibility rules; some limited exceptions apply. Players may hold more than one non-FIFA nationality.

| No. | Pos. | Nation | Player |
|---|---|---|---|
| 0 | GK | USA | Kerri Butler |
| 1 | GK | USA | Didi Haracic |
| 2 | MF | USA | Christy Bush |
| 3 | DF | USA | Madyson Brown |
| 4 | DF | USA | Bo Visavakul |
| 5 | MF | USA | Jill Porto |
| 6 | MF | USA | Katie Menzie |
| 7 | FW | USA | Christie Welsh |
| 8 | MF | USA | Brittany Cummins |
| 9 | FW | USA | Katie Watson |
| 10 | FW | USA | Amalya Clayton |
| 12 | MF | USA | Hayley Siegel |

| No. | Pos. | Nation | Player |
|---|---|---|---|
| 13 | FW | USA | Tiffany Brown |
| 14 | DF | USA | Elisa Davidson |
| 15 | DF | USA | Marisa Abegg |
| 16 | DF | USA | Ashley Bazzarone |
| 20 | DF | USA | Jerica DeWolfe |
| 21 | MF | USA | Christine Nairn |
| 23 | DF | USA | Bri Hovington |
| 26 | MF | USA | Katie Cramp |
| 27 | MF | USA | Danielle Malagari |
| 28 | DF | USA | Megan Watson |
| 29 | GK | USA | Jane Aman |

=== Team management and staff ===
| Position | Staff |
|---|---|
| President and Chief Executive Officer | (United States) William Lynch |
| General Manager | (United States) Chris Hummer |

Last updated: July 10, 2011

== Statistics ==
=== Field players ===
| Nat | No. | Player | Pos | GP | Pts. | Min. | G | A | S | F | Booked | Sent off (straight red) |
|---|---|---|---|---|---|---|---|---|---|---|---|---|
| (United States) | 2 | Christy Bush | MF | 7 | 0 | 248 | 0 | 0 | 0 | 1 | 0 | 0 |
| (United States) | 3 | Madyson Brown | DF | 7 | 0 | 425 | 0 | 0 | 8 | 6 | 0 | 0 |
| (United States) | 4 | Bo Visavakul | DF | 1 | 0 | 9 | 0 | 0 | 0 | 1 | 0 | 0 |
| (United States) | 5 | Jill Porto | MF | 5 | 2 | 105 | 1 | 0 | 3 | 1 | 0 | 0 |
| (United States) | 6 | Katie Menzie | MF | 8 | 0 | 654 | 0 | 0 | 9 | 1 | 0 | 0 |
| (United States) | 7 | Christie Welsh | FW | 6 | 6 | 184 | 3 | 0 | 9 | 1 | 1 | 0 |
| (United States) | 8 | Brittany Cummins | MF | 9 | 0 | 505 | 0 | 0 | 3 | 3 | 0 | 0 |
| (United States) | 9 | Katie Watson | FW | 7 | 0 | 505 | 0 | 0 | 2 | 1 | 0 | 0 |
| (United States) | 10 | Amalya Clayton | FW | 7 | 2 | 365 | 1 | 0 | 6 | 0 | 0 | 0 |
| (United States) | 12 | Hayley Siegel | MF | 8 | 5 | 604 | 2 | 1 | 9 | 9 | 0 | 0 |
| (United States) | 13 | Tyfanny Brown | FW | 10 | 2 | 736 | 1 | 0 | 13 | 5 | 0 | 0 |
| (United States) | 14 | Elisa Davidson | DF | 5 | 0 | 147 | 0 | 0 | 0 | 0 | 0 | 0 |
| (United States) | 15 | Marisa Abegg | DF | 9 | 1 | 810 | 0 | 1 | 5 | 6 | 0 | 0 |
| (United States) | 18 | Ashley Bazzarone | DF | 1 | 0 | 49 | 0 | 0 | 0 | 0 | 0 | 0 |
| (United States) | 20 | Jerica DeWolfe | DF | 10 | 2 | 855 | 1 | 0 | 5 | 2 | 0 | 0 |
| (United States) | 21 | Christine Nairn | MF | 4 | 7 | 360 | 3 | 1 | 20 | 3 | 0 | 0 |
| (United States) | 23 | Bri Hovington | DF | 8 | 4 | 634 | 1 | 2 | 7 | 4 | 0 | 0 |
| (United States) | 26 | Katie Cramp | MF | 7 | 0 | 218 | 0 | 0 | 1 | 2 | 0 | 0 |
| (United States) | 27 | Danielle Malagari | MF | 10 | 2 | 618 | 0 | 2 | 20 | 3 | 0 | 0 |
| (United States) | 28 | Megan Watson | DF | 7 | 0 | 505 | 0 | 0 | 2 | 1 | 0 | 0 |

Updated to match played July 12, 2011
