= Cacela Island =

Island in southern Portugal

Coordinates: 37.152°N 7.546°W

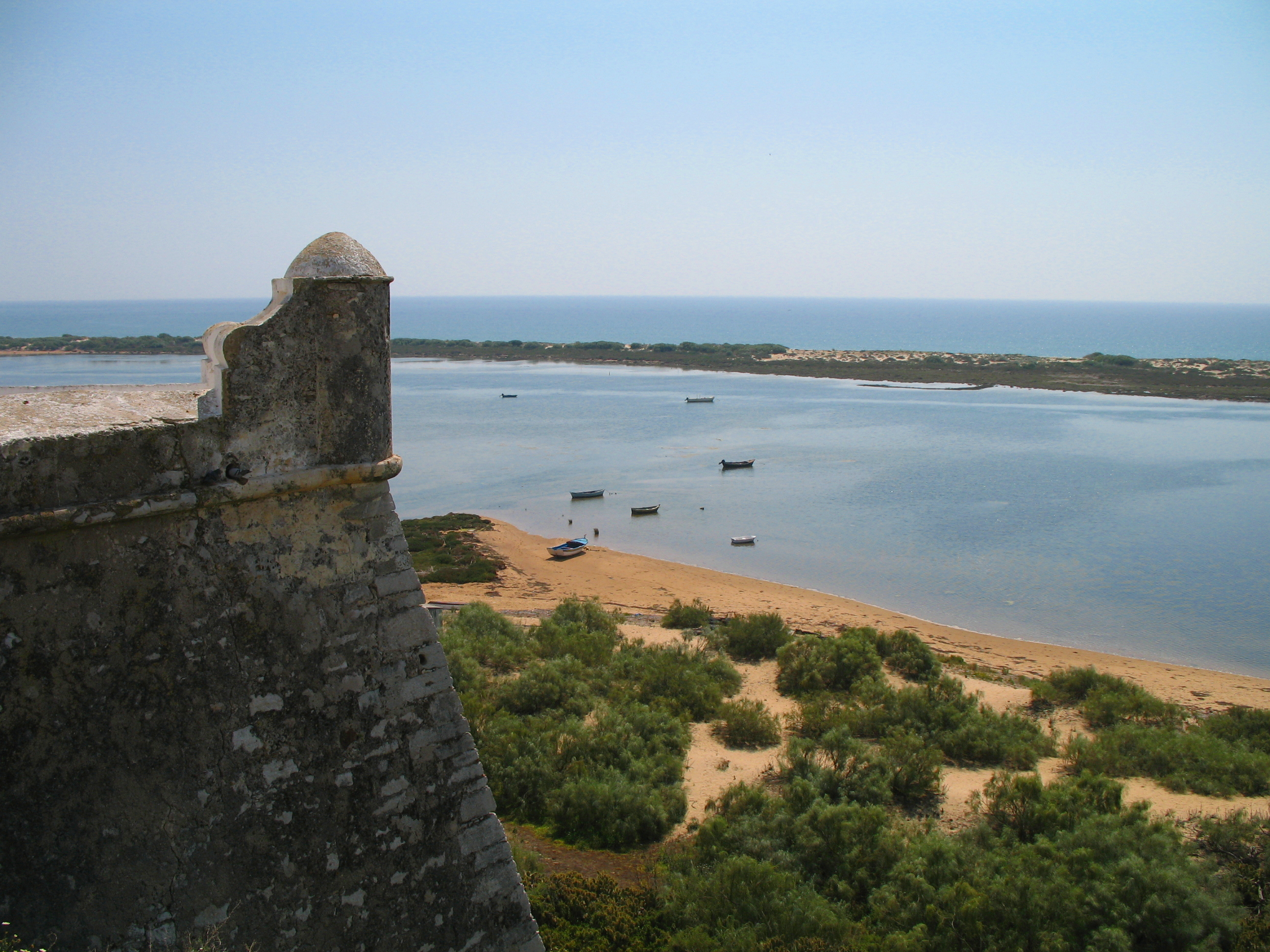
Cacela Island as seen from the fortress of Cacela Velha, Algarve, Portugal

Cacela Island is a sandy barrier island at the mouth of the Ria Formosa in the Algarve region of mainland Portugal. It was part of a peninsula up to the autumn of 2010, when as a result of storm action, the sea cut the peninsula and turned its westernmost part into an island.

Access to the island's beach is made either by wading or boat. The island's beach is known as Praia da Fábrica, or "Factory Site Beach".

The former peninsula was 4.4 kilometres (2.7 mi) in length and its width was 0.05 to 0.15 km (0.03 to 0.09 mi).

Both the island and the remaining part of the peninsula are located in the civil parish of Vila Nova de Cacela, which in turn is a part of the municipality of Vila Real de Santo António. The island is in the Ria Formosa Natural Park.
