= Christie Welsh =

American soccer player (born 1981)

Personal information
- Full name: Christie Renee Welsh
- Date of birth: February 27, 1981 (age 45)
- Place of birth: Massapequa Park, New York, United States
- Height: 5 ft 10 in (1.78 m)
- Position: Forward

College career
Years	Team	Apps	(Gls)
1999–2002	Penn State Nittany Lions	97	(82)

Senior career*
Years	Team	Apps	(Gls)
2000	Long Island Lady Riders	2	(1)
2001–2002	Hampton Roads Piranhas	8	(12)
2003	New York Power	12	(6)
2004	Karlslunds IF DFF		
2005	Olympique Lyonnais		
2005	New Jersey Wildcats	2	(2)
2007–2008	Washington Freedom	20	(18)
2009	Los Angeles Sol	3	(0)
2009	Saint Louis Athletica	11	(3)
2010	Washington Freedom		
2011–2013	D.C. United Women	6	(3)

International career
2000–2006	United States	39	(20)

Managerial career
- 2004–2006: Penn State Nittany Lions (assistant)
- 2011: Wisconsin Badgers (assistant)
- 2012: Saint Joseph's Hawks (assistant)
- 2013–2015: Oregon Ducks (assistant)
- 2016–2019: Montclair Kimberley Cougars
- * Club domestic league appearances and goals

Christie Renee Welsh (born February 27, 1981) is an American former soccer player who played as a forward. She previously played for the New York Power of Women's United Soccer Association (WUSA) as well as the Los Angeles Sol, Saint Louis Athletica, and Washington Freedom of Women's Professional Soccer (WPS). She is also a former member of the United States women's national soccer team.

== Early life ==
Born in Massapequa Park, New York, Welsh attended Massapequa High School on Long Island in Massapequa, New York. She was a two-time Parade All-American and a 1999 NSCAA All-American. Welsh was the 1998 Gatorade Circle of Champions National High School Girls' Soccer Player of the Year. She led Massapequa to the 1997 New York State Championship. Welsh played club soccer with the Northport Cow Harbor Piranha where she won two national titles.

=== Penn State University ===
Welsh attended Penn State University and ended her collegiate career as one of the most decorated athletes in the school's history. In her freshman campaign, Welsh piloted the Lions to their first ever Final Four, led the team and was tied nationally for goals scored (27), and earned Penn State's first College Cup all-tournament honor.

Her junior year, Welsh's received the Hermann Trophy, the sport's most prestigious award given to the nation's top player. She was also honored with the 2001 Missouri Athletic Club Player of the Year award. She finished her career amassing four NSCAA All-America honors, three consecutive Soccer America Collegiate MVP's, and three Big Ten Player of the Year honors. She is still the Big Ten's leading scorer and was part of four Big Ten title teams and two College Cup squads during her time at Penn State. Her 2002 season at Penn State yielded a Final Four appearance in the Division I NCAA Championship and were Big Ten Champions. Welsh ended her collegiate career at Penn State with 82 goals and 52 assists plus 27 game-winning goals which are all Big 10 records.

== Playing career ==
=== New York Power ===
Welsh was drafted second overall by the New York Power of the now-defunct WUSA professional league. She scored six goals in 12 games during her rookie season.

=== Los Angeles Sol & Saint Louis Athletica ===
In 2009, Welsh was selected with the 5th pick of the second round (12th overall) by the Los Angeles Sol in the WPS General Player Draft. She appeared in three games for Los Angeles before being traded to the Saint Louis Athletica on May 9, 2009. She finished the 2009 season with three goals in 11 games for St. Louis.

=== Washington Freedom ===
Welsh was acquired by the Washington Freedom before the start of the 2010 season.

=== D.C. United ===
After the Freedom was moved to Florida under new ownership for the 2011 season, Welsh joined D.C. United Women originally as an assistant coach, but has attained a second role as a substitute forward.

=== International ===
Amidst top U.S. players out for wage boycotts after their 1999 World Cup the national team called up the Nittany Lion striker for the Australian Cup. In January 2000 Welsh made her National Team debut scoring against the Czech Republic in a 8-1 rout in Melbourne, Australia. Welsh took a leave of absence from school and college soccer to establish a residency with the United States Women's National Team in Florida to train.

Welsh scored 11 goals in 15 games for the United States in her first significant season with the full national team. She scored 10 goals faster than any other player in American soccer history. In 2004, Welsh was a member of the U.S. Olympic Residency Training Camp. In 2005, Welsh won the Golden Boot Award as top scorer in the prestigious Algarve Cup tournament with five goals, including the game-winning goal in the championship match against Germany.

== International goals ==
No.	Date	Venue	Opponent	Score	Result	Competition
1.	7 January 2000	Melbourne, Australia	Czech Republic	7–0	8–1	2000 Australia Cup
2.	9 February 2000	Boca Raton, Florida	Norway	1–?	1–2	Friendly
3.	5 April 2000	Davidson, North Carolina	Iceland	?–0	8–0	Friendly
4.	5 April 2000	Davidson, North Carolina	Iceland	?–0	8–0	Friendly
5.	5 April 2000	Davidson, North Carolina	Iceland	?–0	8–0	Friendly
6.	5 May 2000	Portland, Oregon	Mexico	8–0	8–0	2000 Women's U.S. Cup
7.	7 May 2000	Portland, Oregon	Canada	4–0	4–0	2000 Women's U.S. Cup
8.	4 June 2000	Sydney, Australia	New Zealand	1–0	5–0	Friendly
9.	4 June 2000	Sydney, Australia	New Zealand	2–0	5–0	Friendly
10.	25 June 2000	Louisville, Kentucky	Costa Rica	4–0	8–0	2000 CONCACAF Women's Gold Cup
11.	25 June 2000	Louisville, Kentucky	Costa Rica	7–0	8–0	2000 CONCACAF Women's Gold Cup
12.	13 March 2001	Silves, Portugal	Portugal	1–0	2–0	2001 Algarve Cup
13.	24 April 2004	Birmingham, Alabama	Brazil	4–1	5–1	Friendly
14.	9 March 2005	Ferreiras, Portugal	France	1–0	1–0	2005 Algarve Cup
15.	11 March 2005	Guia, Portugal	Finland	1–0	3–0	2005 Algarve Cup
16.	11 March 2005	Guia, Portugal	Finland	2–0	3–0	2005 Algarve Cup
17.	13 March 2005	Vila Real de Santo António, Portugal	Denmark	3–0	4–0	2005 Algarve Cup
18.	15 March 2005	Faro/Loulé, Portugal	Germany	1–0	1–0	2005 Algarve Cup
19.	26 June 2005	Virginia Beach, Virginia	Canada	2–0	2–0	Friendly
20.	10 July 2005	Portland, Oregon	Ukraine	1–0	7–0	Friendly

== Coaching career ==
Welsh is currently an assistant coach at University of Oregon. She previously served as a volunteer assistant coach for Penn State from 2004 to 2006 and Wisconsin in 2011. She is also head coach and director of the U16 FC Bucks Revolution club team.

== See also ==
- List of Pennsylvania State University Olympians
