= Manta Rota =

Town in southeast Portugal

Coordinates: 37.168°N 7.519°W

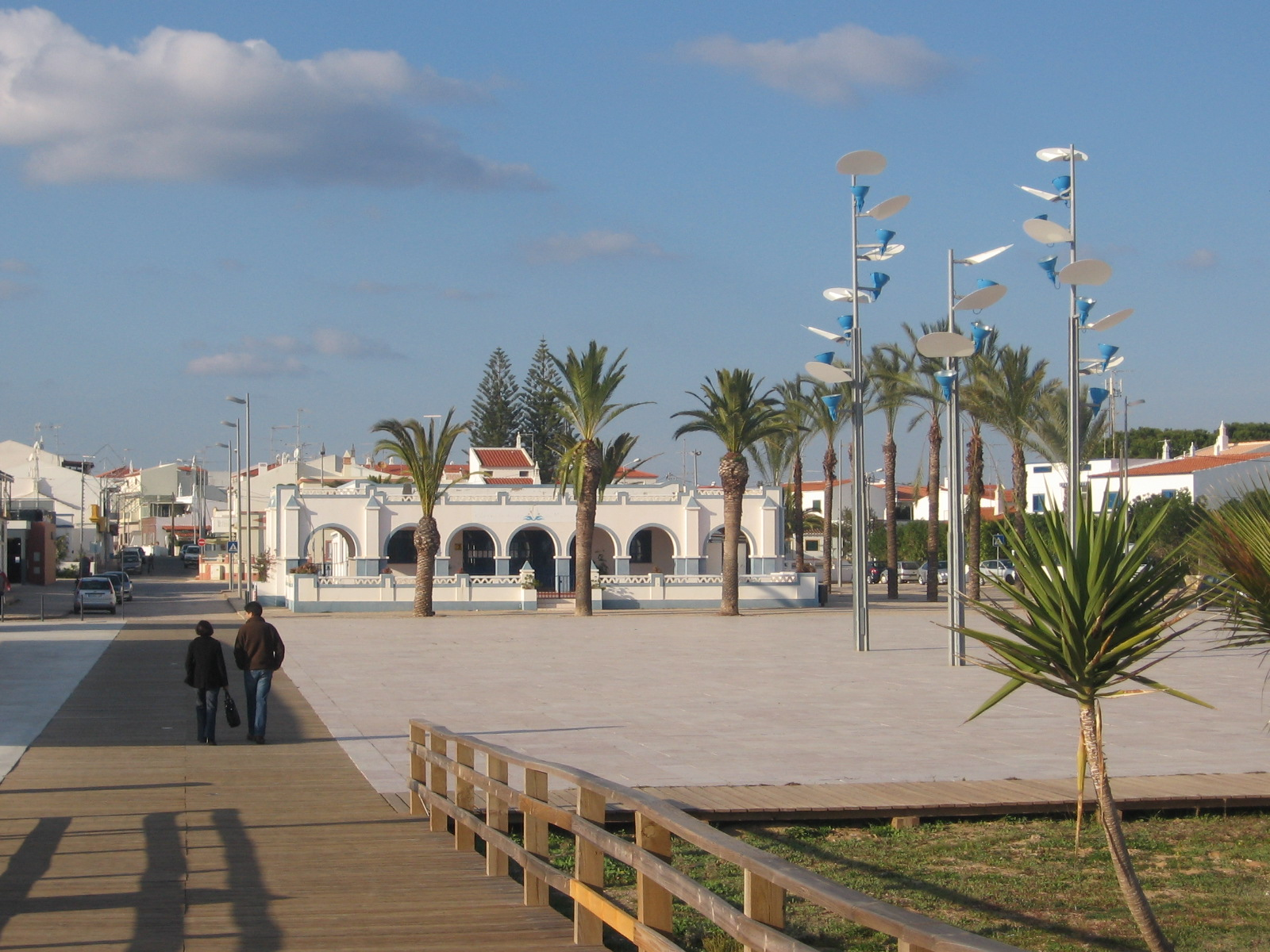
Manta Rota

Manta Rota is a small seaside town in the civil parish of Vila Nova de Cacela, municipality of Vila Real de Santo António, in the Algarve, Portugal. Manta Rota is an important tourist destination due to its sandy beaches by the Atlantic Ocean.

== Location ==
Manta Rota beach is located 10 km west of Vila Real de Santo Antonio, 15 km east of Tavira, and about 40 km east of Faro.

== Points of Interest ==
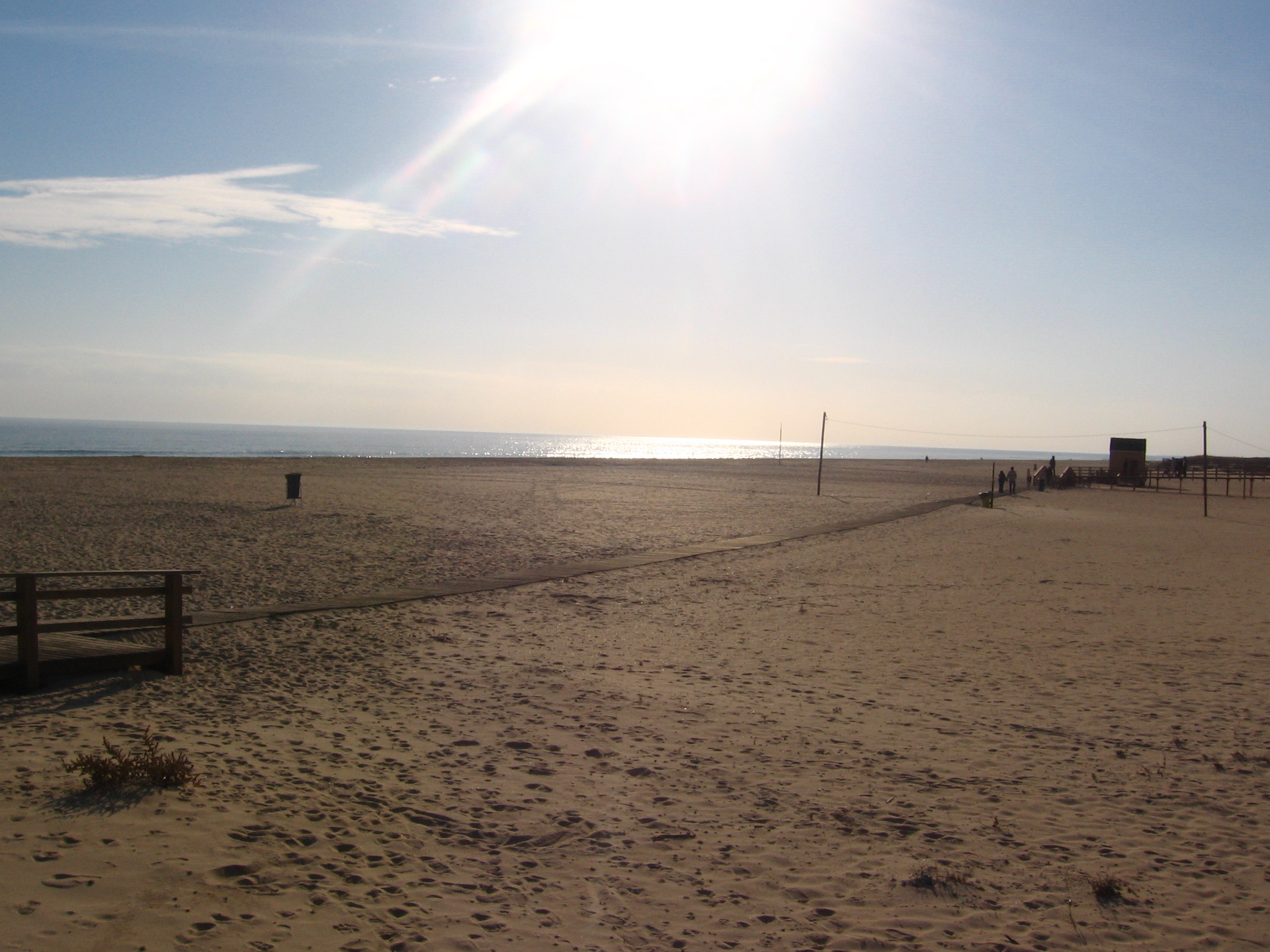
Praia da Manta Rota.

Manta Rota Beach is located at the very edge of Ria Formosa Natural Park, an important wetland where migratory birds can be observed in abundance.
