= 2005 Algarve Cup =

International women's football tournament

Tournament details
- Host country: Portugal
- City: Algarve
- Dates: 9–15 March
- Teams: 12 (from 3 confederations)

Final positions
- Champions: United States (4th title)
- Runners-up: Germany
- Third place: France
- Fourth place: Sweden

Tournament statistics
- Matches played: 24
- Goals scored: 71 (2.96 per match)
- Top scorer(s): (United States) Christie Welsh (5 goals)
- Best player: (Germany) Birgit Prinz
- Best goalkeeper: (Norway) Bente Nordby

The 2005 Algarve Cup was the 12th edition of the Algarve Cup, an invitational women's football tournament held annually in Portugal. It took place from 9 to 15 March 2005. The USA won the tournament defeating Germany, 1–0, in the final-game. The tournament victory was the fourth for the US, and their third in a row.

== Format ==
The twelve invited teams were split into three groups that played a round-robin tournament.

Since the expansion to 12 teams in 2002, the Algarve Cup format had been as follows: Groups A and B, containing the strongest ranked teams, were the only ones in contention to win the title. The group A and B winners contested the final – to win the Algarve Cup. The runners-up played for third place, and those that finish third in the groups played for fifth place. The teams in Group C played for places 7–12. The winner of Group C played the team that finished fourth in Group A or B (whichever has the better record) for seventh place. The Group C runner-up played the team who finishes last in Group A or B (with the worse record) for ninth place. The third and fourth-placed teams in Group C played for the eleventh place.

Points awarded in the group stage followed the standard formula of three points for a win, one point for a draw and zero points for a loss. In the case of two teams being tied on the same number of points in a group, their head-to-head result determined the higher place.

== Teams ==
Team	FIFA Rankings (December 2004)
Germany	1
United States	2
Norway	3
Sweden	5
China	6
Denmark	7
France	9
England	14
Finland	16
Mexico	25
Portugal (hosts)	34
Northern Ireland	83

== Group stage ==
=== Group A ===
Team	Pld	W	D	L	GF	GA	GD	Pts
Germany	3	3	0	0	8	1	+7	9
Sweden	3	1	1	1	4	3	+1	4
Norway	3	1	1	1	3	6	−3	4
China	3	0	0	3	1	6	−5	0

9 March 2005

Norway	2–1	China
Rønning 57'; Wiik 76'		Han Duan 68'

Lagos
9 March 2005

Sweden	1–2	Germany
Johansson 68'	SvFF Report (in Swedish)	Smisek 6'; Prinz 77'

Lagos
11 March 2005

China	0–2	Sweden
	SvFF Report (in Swedish)	Östberg 35'; Johansson 39'

Silves
11 March 2005

Germany	4–0	Norway
Mittag 15'; Prinz 56', 58'; Pohlers 65'

Silves
13 March 2005

China	0–2	Germany
		Smisek 18'; Wunderlich 80'

Alvor
13 March 2005

Sweden	1–1	Norway
Seger 18'	SvFF Report (in Swedish)	Kaufmann 84'

Loulé

=== Group B ===
Team	Pld	W	D	L	GF	GA	GD	Pts
United States	3	3	0	0	8	0	+8	9
France	3	2	0	1	4	3	+1	6
Denmark	3	1	0	2	5	7	−2	3
Finland	3	0	0	3	2	9	−7	0

9 March 2005

Denmark	4–1	Finland

Ferreiras
9 March 2005

France	0–1	United States
	Report	Welsh 20'

Ferreiras
11 March 2005

United States	3–0	Finland
Welsh 8', 41'; Wambach 52'	Report

Guia
11 March 2005

Denmark	1–2	France
Pedersen 18'		Pichon 16' (pen.); Diacre 90'

Guia
13 March 2005

United States	4–0	Denmark
Lilly 6', 58'; Wambach 15'; Welsh 28'	Report

Vila Real de San Antonio
13 March 2005

Finland	1–2	France
Mäkinen 29'		Pichon 51'; Dusang 85'

Loulé

=== Group C ===
Team	Pld	W	D	L	GF	GA	GD	Pts
England	3	3	0	0	13	0	+13	9
Mexico	3	2	0	1	4	6	−2	6
Northern Ireland	3	1	0	2	2	7	−5	3
Portugal	3	0	0	3	2	8	−6	0

9 March 2005

England	4–0	Northern Ireland
Carney 32'; Exley 53', 89'; McArthur 56'

Paderne
9 March 2005

Portugal	1–2	Mexico
Tânia Pinto 11'	Report	Leyva 52'; Leticia Villalpando 72'

Paderne
11 March 2005
16:15 (WET)

England	4–0	Portugal
Stoney 10'; Yankey 30', 90'; Barr 77'	Report

Estádio de São Luís, Faro
Referee: Eun ah Hong
11 March 2005

Mexico	2–0	Northern Ireland
Pérez 23'; González 31'

Faro
13 March 2005

England	5–0	Mexico
Williams 2', 68'; Handley 34'; Yankey 52'; Smith 78'

Lagos
13 March 2005

Northern Ireland	2–1	Portugal
Hall 18'; Hutton 25'	Report	Carneiro 38'

Lagos

== Placement play-offs ==
=== Eleventh place match ===
15 March 2005

Portugal	3–1	Northern Ireland
Paula Cristina 58'; Dani 82'; Couto 86'	Report	McFadden 39'

Algarve

=== Ninth place match ===
15 March 2005

Finland	1–1	Mexico
Levya 40' (o.g.)		González 67'
Penalties
	5–6

Algarve

=== Seventh place match ===
15 March 2005

China	0–0	England
Penalties
	5–3

Algarve

=== Fifth place match ===
15 March 2005

Norway	2–1	Denmark
Christensen 18'; Rønning 22'		Pedersen 13'

Algarve

=== Third place match ===
15 March 2005

Sweden	2–3	France
Johansson 37', 64'	SvFF Report (in Swedish)	Georges 5'; Béghé 53'; Lattaf 79'

Algarve

=== Final ===
15 March 2005

Germany	0–1	United States
	Report	Welsh 23'

Estádio do Algarve, Faro-Loulé
Attendance: 1,000
Referee: Florea Cristina Ionescu (Romania)

Germany	United States

GERMANY:
GK	1	Silke Rottenberg
DF	2	Kerstin Stegemann
DF	17	Ariane Hingst
DF	4	Steffi Jones
DF	5	Sarah Günther	(substituted off) 70'
MF	18	Kerstin Garefrekes
MF	14	Britta Carlson	(substituted off) 32'
MF	6	Renate Lingor	(substituted off) 86'
MF	20	Conny Pohlers	(substituted off) 46'
FW	9	Birgit Prinz (c)
FW	11	Anja Mittag	(substituted off) 66'
Substitutes:
DF	3	Sonja Fuss	(substituted on) 70'
MF	16	Viola Odebrecht	(substituted on) 32'
MF	13	Celia Okoyino Da Mbabi	(substituted on) 86'
MF	7	Pia Wunderlich	(substituted on) 83'
FW	8	Sandra Smisek	(substituted on) 66'
Manager:
(Germany) Tina Theune-Meyer

UNITED STATES:
GK	1	Hope Solo
DF	15	Kate Markgraf
DF	2	Heather Mitts
DF	4	Cat Reddick
MF	7	Shannon Boxx
MF	17	Lori Chalupny
MF	13	Kristine Lilly (c)
MF	5	Lindsay Tarpley
FW	10	Aly Wagner	(substituted off) 75'
FW	20	Abby Wambach
FW	8	Christie Welsh	(substituted off) 83'
Substitutes:
MF	9	Heather O'Reilly	(substituted on) 83'
MF	19	Angela Hucles	(substituted on) 75'
Manager:
(United States) Greg Ryan

2005 Algarve Cup

United States
Fourth title

== Final standings ==
Rank	Team
1st place, gold medalist(s)	United States
2nd place, silver medalist(s)	Germany
3rd place, bronze medalist(s)	France
4	Sweden
5	Norway
6	Denmark
7	China
8	England
9	Mexico
10	Finland
11	Portugal
12	Northern Ireland
