= Monte Gordo (Vila Real de Santo António) =

- Civil parish
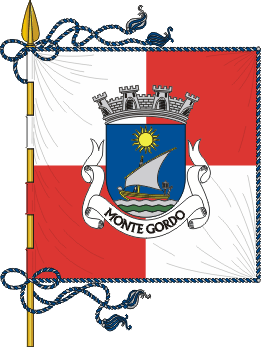
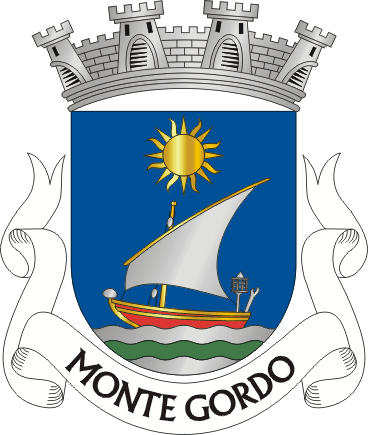
- Flag Coat of arms

- Location in Portugal
- Coordinates: 37.180°N 7.453°W
- Country: Portugal
- Region: Algarve
- Intermunic. comm.: Algarve
- District: Faro
- Municipality: Vila Real de Santo António

Area
  - Total: 4.22 km^{2} (1.63 sq mi)

Population (2011)
  - Total: 3,308
  - Density: 784/km^{2} (2,030/sq mi)
- Time zone: UTC+00:00 (WET)
  - Summer (DST): UTC+01:00 (WEST)

Monte Gordo is a town and a freguesia (parish) of the municipality of Vila Real de Santo António, in the southeastern corner of Algarve, Portugal. The population in 2011 was 3,308, in an area of 4.22 km^{2}. Formerly a fishermen's town, Monte Gordo's economy is nowadays oriented to tourism due to its sunny weather, long white sand beaches, trails in the surrounding pine woods, sand dunes, and seafood. Furthermore, the adjacent natural reserve - Reserva Natural do Sapal de Castro Marim e Vila Real de Santo António - attracts tourists due to its diverse fauna, which comprises some 153 species of birds, including storks, avocets, sandpipers and flocks of flamingos, as well as more than 400 plant species and various reptiles, amphibians and mammals. Its strategic location is also a plus, given that is located adjacent to the cities of Vila Real de Santo António and Castro Marim, as well as other nearby touristic attractions such as Cacela Velha and Tavira.

Prior to the Carnation Revolution in 1974, Monte Gordo was a favorite destination for the Portuguese and Spanish aristocracies as well as famous people (e.g. Ingrid Bergman). Its Casino was built in 1934 and Hotel Vasco da Gama was the first grand hotel in Algarve (built in 1960). After the advent of democracy, Monte Gordo also became a favorite summer destination for the Portuguese middle class.

Monte Gordo beach is best known for its sunny weather all year round, as well as for its relatively calm and warm seawater. The average air temperature ranges from a low of 11 °C in January to a high of 26 °C in August, while the average sea temperature ranges from a low of 16 °C in February to a high of 22 °C between July and September, making this the maritime beach with the warmest sea in mainland Portugal. Another particularity of this beach is the fact that during the low tide one is able to walk 10 to 30 meters into the sea, making it one of the safest in Portugal for children. These conditions make it ideal for beach goers to collect clams lightly buried in the sand (locals call "conquilhas" to the local variety of edible Donax saltwater clams). Monte Gordo beach holds the Blue Flag quality certificate for more than 2 decades.

Though most tourists are Portuguese during the summer, in the winter Monte Gordo is mostly visited by foreigners from Northern Europe looking for a warm vacation destination. Given the nearby VRSA Sports Complex, accredited by IAAF and home of the Portuguese Olympic Committee, Monte Gordo is also a popular destination for international athletes during the winter.

The Monte Gordo Sand Race for motorcycles and quads takes place on the beach annually in November. The race is a round of the FIM Sand Races World Championship.

There are also several Dutch and Irish bars as well as restaurants (mostly owned by expatriates from those countries) alongside the traditional Portuguese venues.

The main festivity in Monte Gordo is the Nossa Senhora das Dores Procession, a catholic celebration held on the second Sunday of September. Its new year and carnival festivities are also well-known.

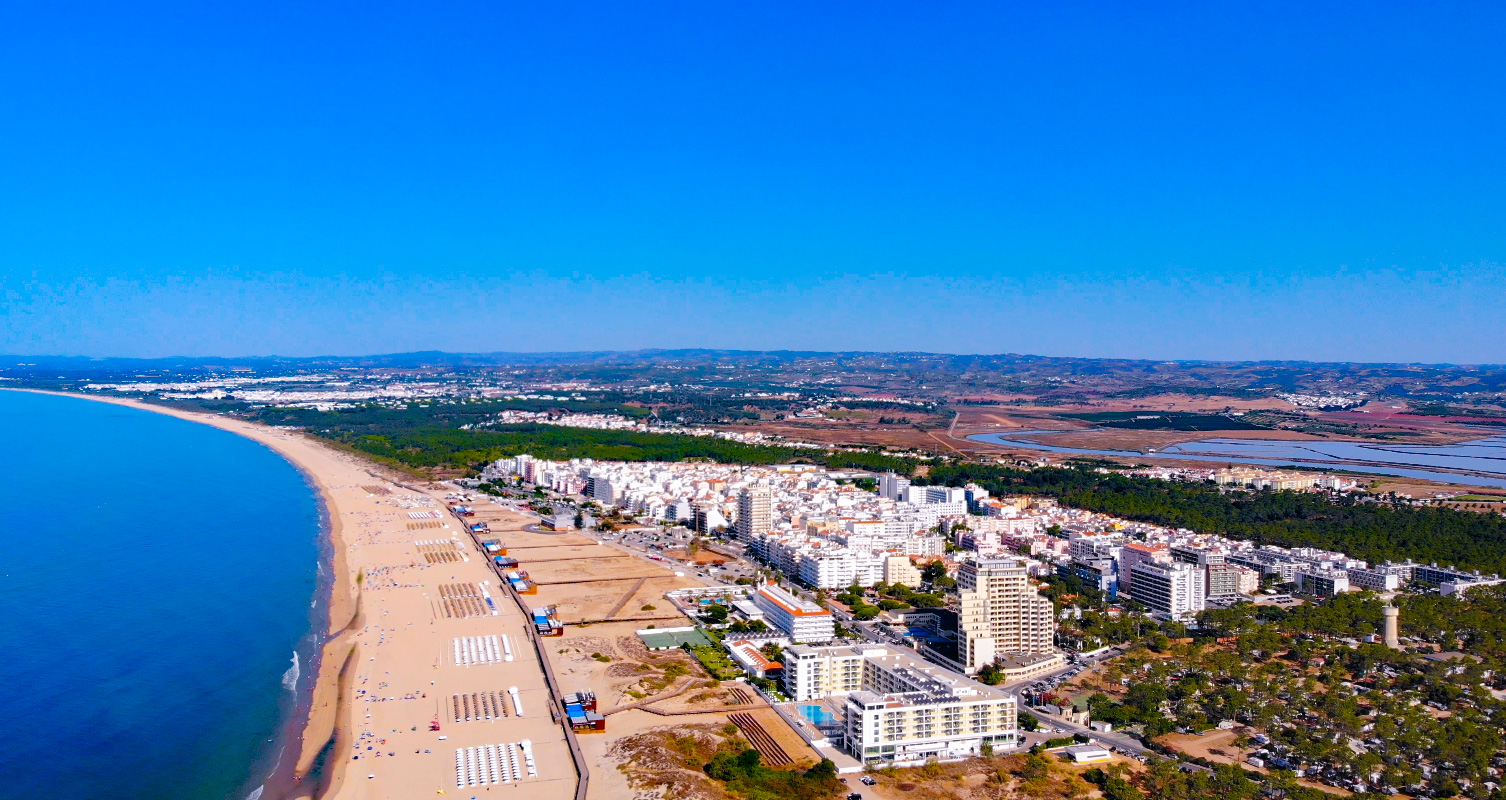
Monte Gordo Algarve Portugal Beach (aerial view towards West)
