= Monte Francisco =

Coordinates: 37°14′06″N 7°27′08″W

Monte Francisco is a small Portuguese town in the southern region of Algarve. It belongs to the municipality (concelho) of Castro Marim and is at a short distance from the border with Spain. Its population of around 700 fluctuates, depending on the time of year; in summer the population usually doubles.

The town's economy is based mainly on tourism and real estate (the Golf Castro Marim Resort and the Golf Quinta do Vale are very close).

The main tourist attractions of this town are its quiet environment, the hospitality of its people, its proximity to the beaches of Vila Real and Monte Gordo and its popular festivals, among which the Emigrant's Feast stands out. It is also the birthplace of Paco de Lucía's mother.
