= Fortress of Cacela =

Coordinates: 37°8′21″N 7°35′38″W

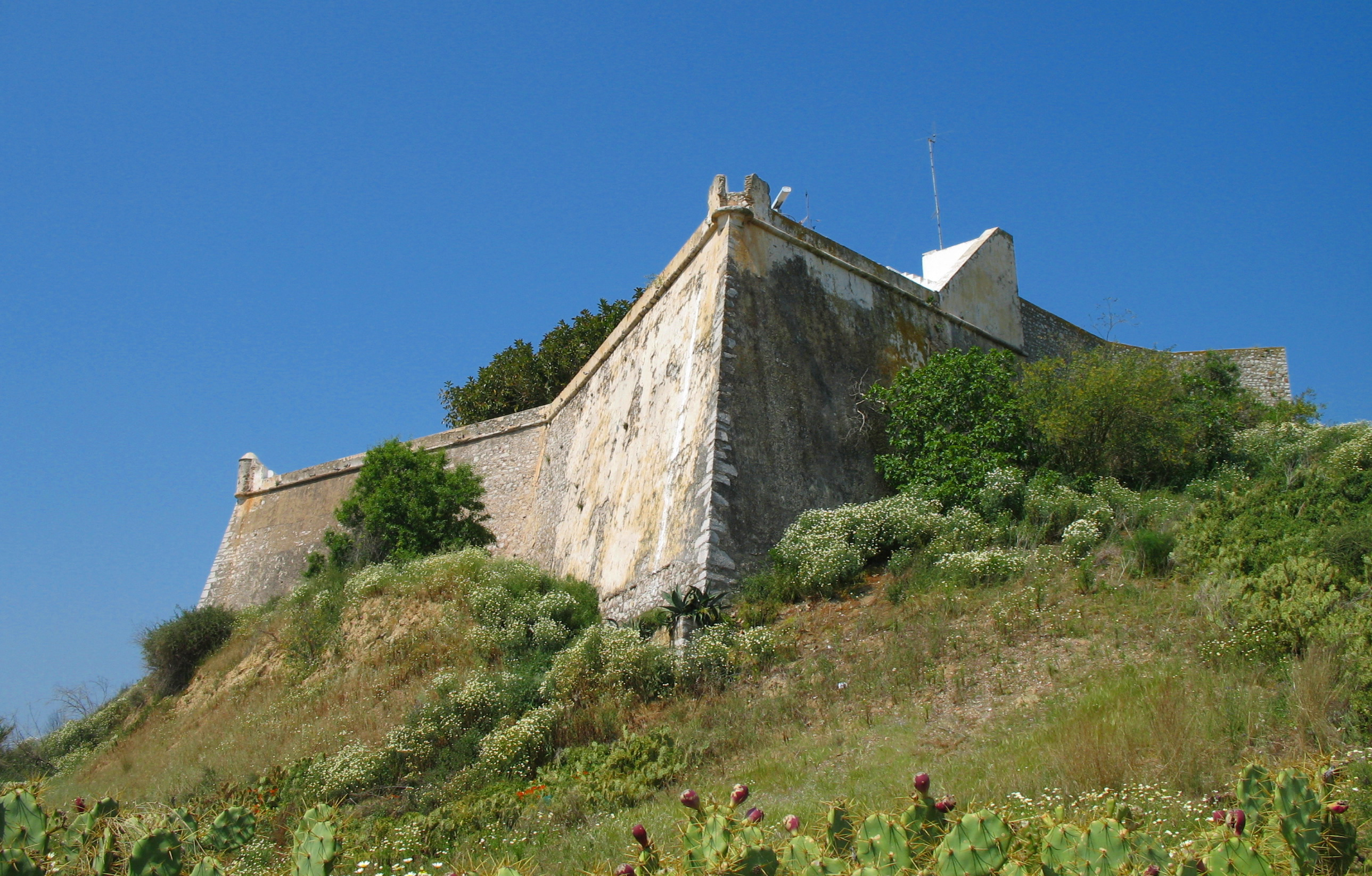
Fortaleza de Cacela

The Fortress of Cacela (Portuguese: Fortaleza de Cacela also known as Fort Cavaleiros de Santiago (Portuguese: Fortaleza dos Cavaleiros de Santiago is a fortress in the civil parish of Vila Nova de Cacela, municipality of Vila Real de Santo António, in the southeastern Portuguese district of Faro (Algarve).

A castle was built there in the Muslim period. The current structure was built between 1770 and 1794.

Located within the boundaries of the Nature Park of Ria Formosa and Rede Natura 2000 sectorial plan, it was included in the Special Protection Zone of Cacela Velha and designated as a Sítio de Interesse Comunitário (Community Site of Interest) for Ria Formosa and Castro Marim.
