= Vila Real de Santo António =

- Municipality
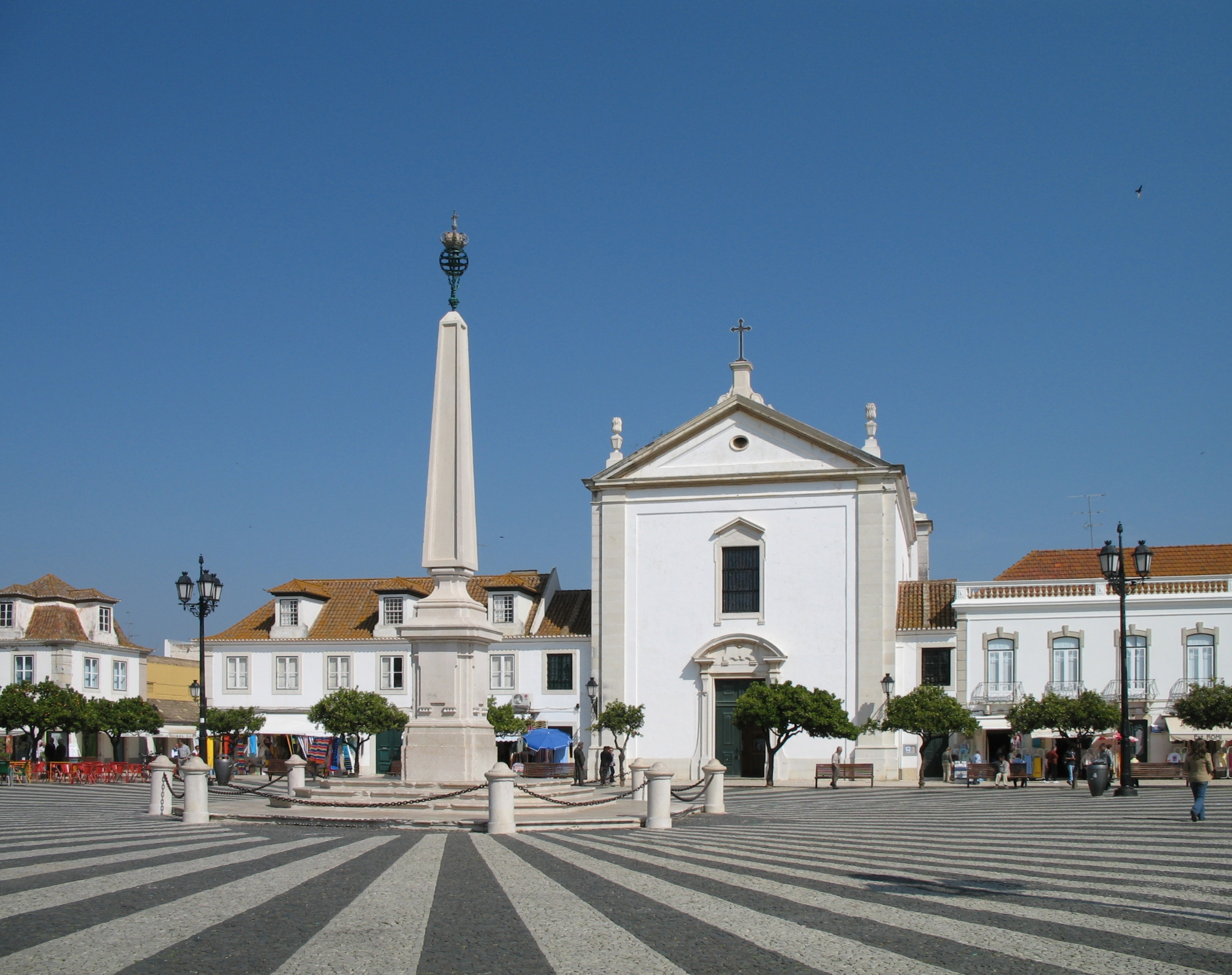
- The main square, Vila Real de Santo António

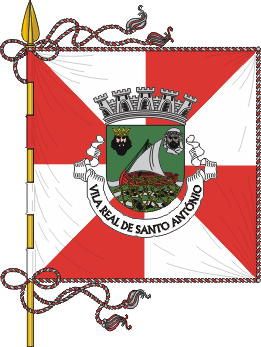
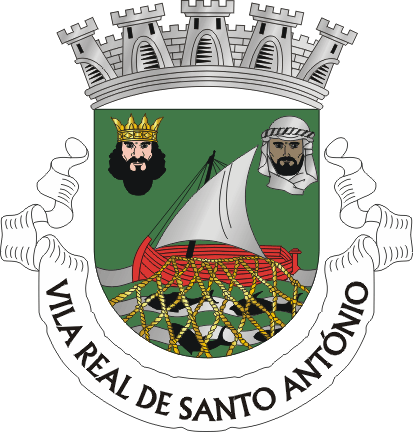
- Flag Coat of arms
- Interactive map of Vila Real de Santo António
- Coordinates: 37°11′38″N 7°24′57″W
- Country: Portugal
- Region: Algarve
- Intermunic. comm.: Algarve
- District: Faro
- Parishes: 3

Government
  - President: Álvaro Araújo (PS)

Area
  - Total: 61.25 km^{2} (23.65 sq mi)

Population (2011)
  - Total: 19,156
  - Density: 312.8/km^{2} (810.0/sq mi)
- Time zone: UTC+00:00 (WET)
  - Summer (DST): UTC+01:00 (WEST)
- Postal code: 8900
- Area code: 281
- Patron: Nossa Senhora da Encarnação
- Website: http://www.cm-vrsa.pt

Vila Real de Santo António (pronounced [ˈvilɐ ʁiˈal d(ɨ) ˈsɐ̃t(u) ɐ̃ˈtɔni.u, - ɐ̃ˈtɔnju]) is a city, civil parish, and municipality in the Algarve, Portugal. The population in 2011 was 19,156, in an area of 61.25 km^{2} (23.65 sq mi). It is one of the few municipalities in Portugal without territorial continuity: its territory comprises two parts, with the municipal seat located in the eastern part. Vila Real de Santo António was founded after the 1755 Lisbon earthquake, and largely expanded in 1774 using the same architectural and construction techniques employed in the reconstruction of Lisbon after the disaster.

The city is situated next to the Guadiana river. Before the construction of the Guadiana International Bridge (in its neighboring upstream municipality of Castro Marim), it used to be the easiest access to Portugal from Andalusia (via ferry from the Spanish city of Ayamonte across the river). Nevertheless, international movement of people and goods is still intense and quite visible in the city.

== History ==
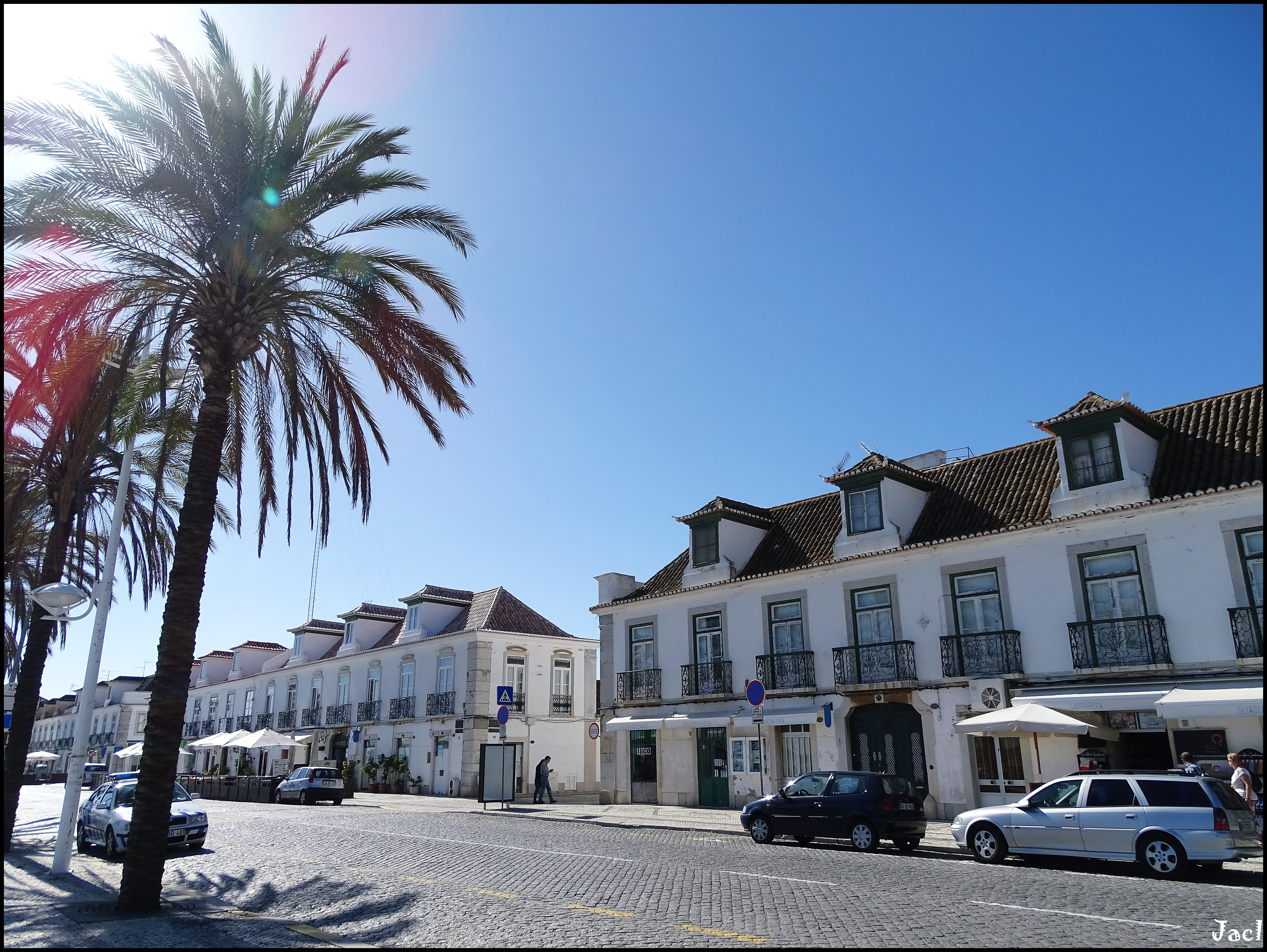
Riverfront avenue

The history of settlement in the region pre-dates the Pombalinan community of the 18th century. The coastline area of Vila Real was inhabited by Megalithic tribes who constructed beehive tombs in the area around Nora, near Cacela. The Romans, and much later the Arabs, made the settlement of Cacela an important village during their occupation of the territory, constructing fortifications to protect them from invading bands.

In 1240, Paio Peres Correia, master of the military Order of Santiago established Cacela as his point of departure for the reconquest of the Algarve, during the Reconquista. Small settlements were eventually established near the Cacela, including many medieval fishing villages, such as Santo António de Arenilha along the coast.

In the 17th century, the vila (town) of Santo António was an important frontier outpost, controlling commerce and developing the lucrative fishing grounds by establishing a fish processing industry. Vila Real de Santo António was a relatively recent community; the region was sparsely populated prior to its foundation and Cacela was the municipal seat of the existing municipality. For centuries, Castro Marim was the only large town guarding the border with Spain, and the settlements in the region were small and undefended. On 30 December 1773, during the reign of Joseph I, a royal decree ordered the creation of a new town at the tip of the Algarve. The impetus for this decision is unclear, but there was several justifications for enhancing the settlement of the region, which included: increasing the human presence near the Spanish border, to prevent any incursions; to better control duties charged on cross-border activity; to be better defend the region from a full-scale attack; or to provoke Spain with a modern settlement that was easily seen from Ayamonte; or to simply rebuild the nearby town fishing village of Santo António de Arenilha and resettle its population. Santo António de Arenilha was destroyed by the same tsunami that was triggered by the devastating 1755 Lisbon earthquake.

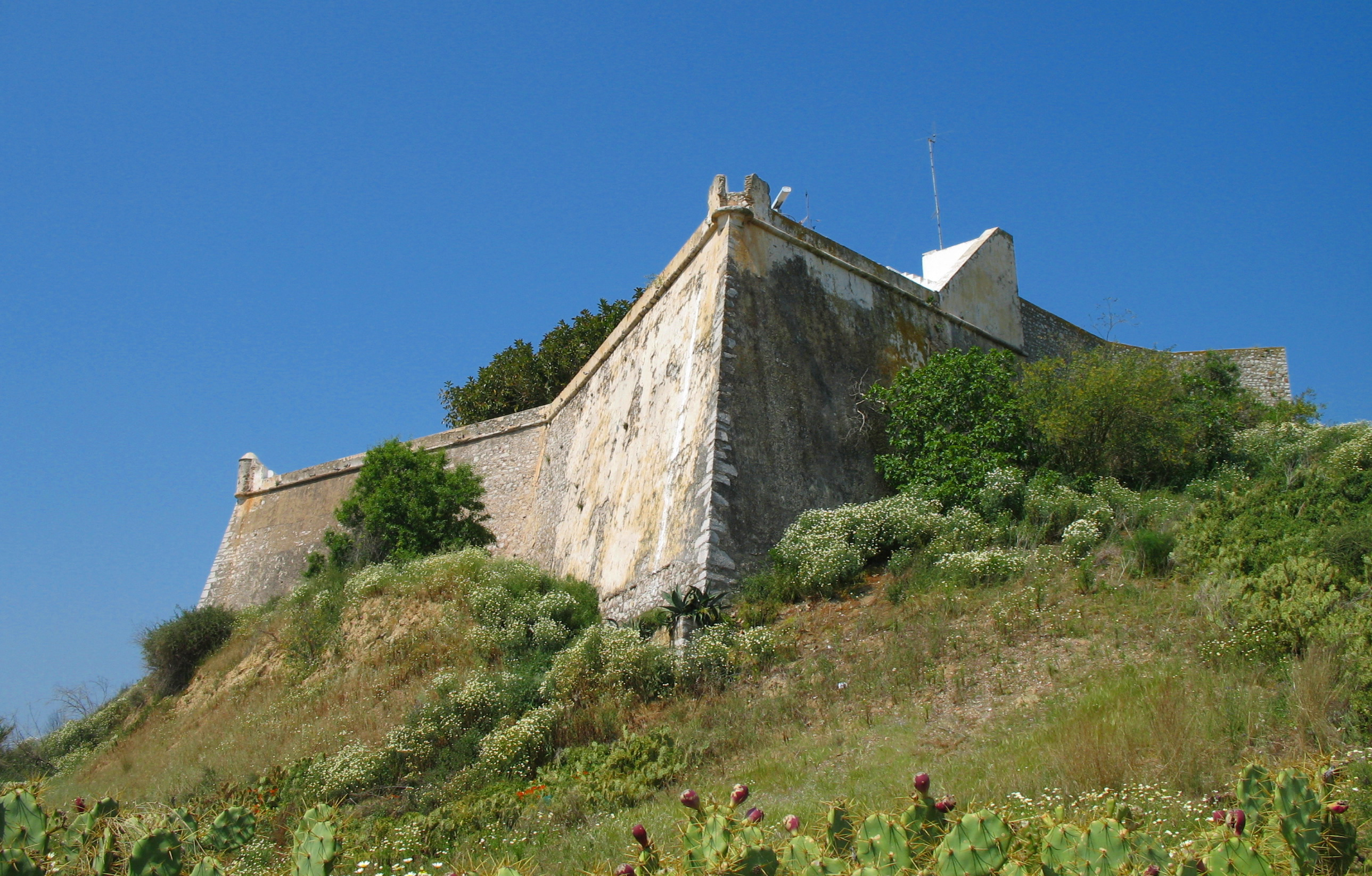
The fortress of Cacela Velha

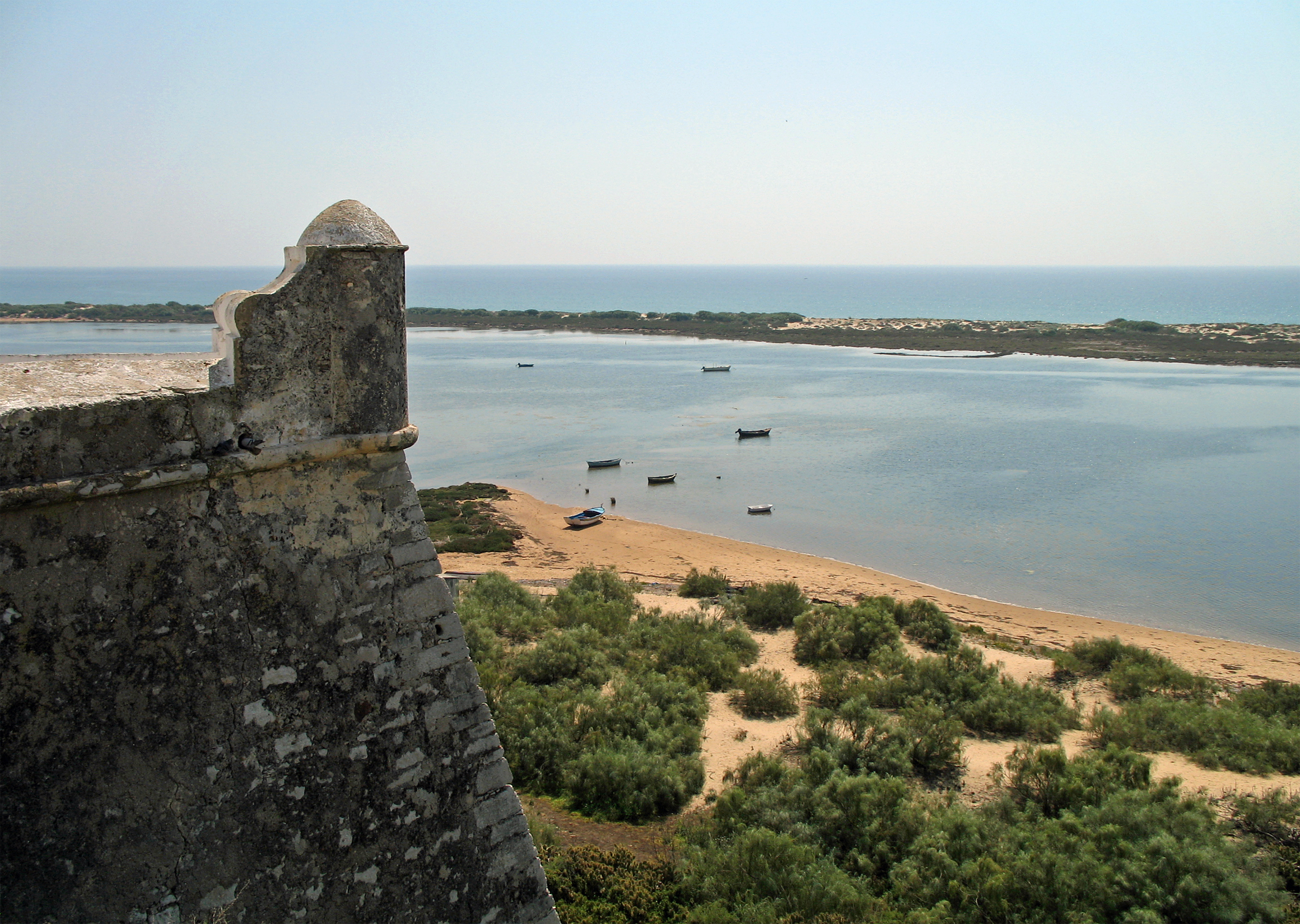
Ocean view from Fortress of Cacela Velha

Regardless, the settlement was erected at great speed for the time (in only two years) and completed in 1776 using the latest technologies. The Marquis of Pombal was responsible for its planning, designing the town in a Pombaline orthogonal grid, which he also used during the reconstruction of Lisbon. In a pioneering technique, entire buildings were prefabricated in areas outside the town, and then transported to their final destination to be assembled, which permitted a fast and methodical construction of the town. Along the river, the customhouses (Portuguese: Alfândega), was one of the first buildings to be completed during the Pombaline reconstruction, to house the offices of the Sociedades das Pescarias (fishing associations/societies), and dividing the settlement in two. The new "Royal Town" of Santo António (Portuguese: Vila Real de Santo António) soon became the seat of the municipality, stripping the once important town of Cacela from this status. Cacela had, in the intervening years, gone into a steady decline as a result of the 1755 earthquake and attacks from English pirates and privateers. As the first canned fish undertaking in the country, the Vila Real de Santo António plant of Conservas Ramirez is the cradle of the sector in Portugal. Vila Real de Santo António thrived on the growth of the fishing industry, which included the processing of species of tuna and sardine. In 1886, it became the first city in the Algarve to have gas lighting installed. As the fishing industry went into decline (around the 1960s), tourism quickly took over as the main economic livelihood for many of its residents. The extensive stretches of sandy beaches attracted both national and international tourists, especially during the warm season. Monte Gordo is particularly visitor-oriented, counting with many hotels, bars and a casino.

== Geography ==
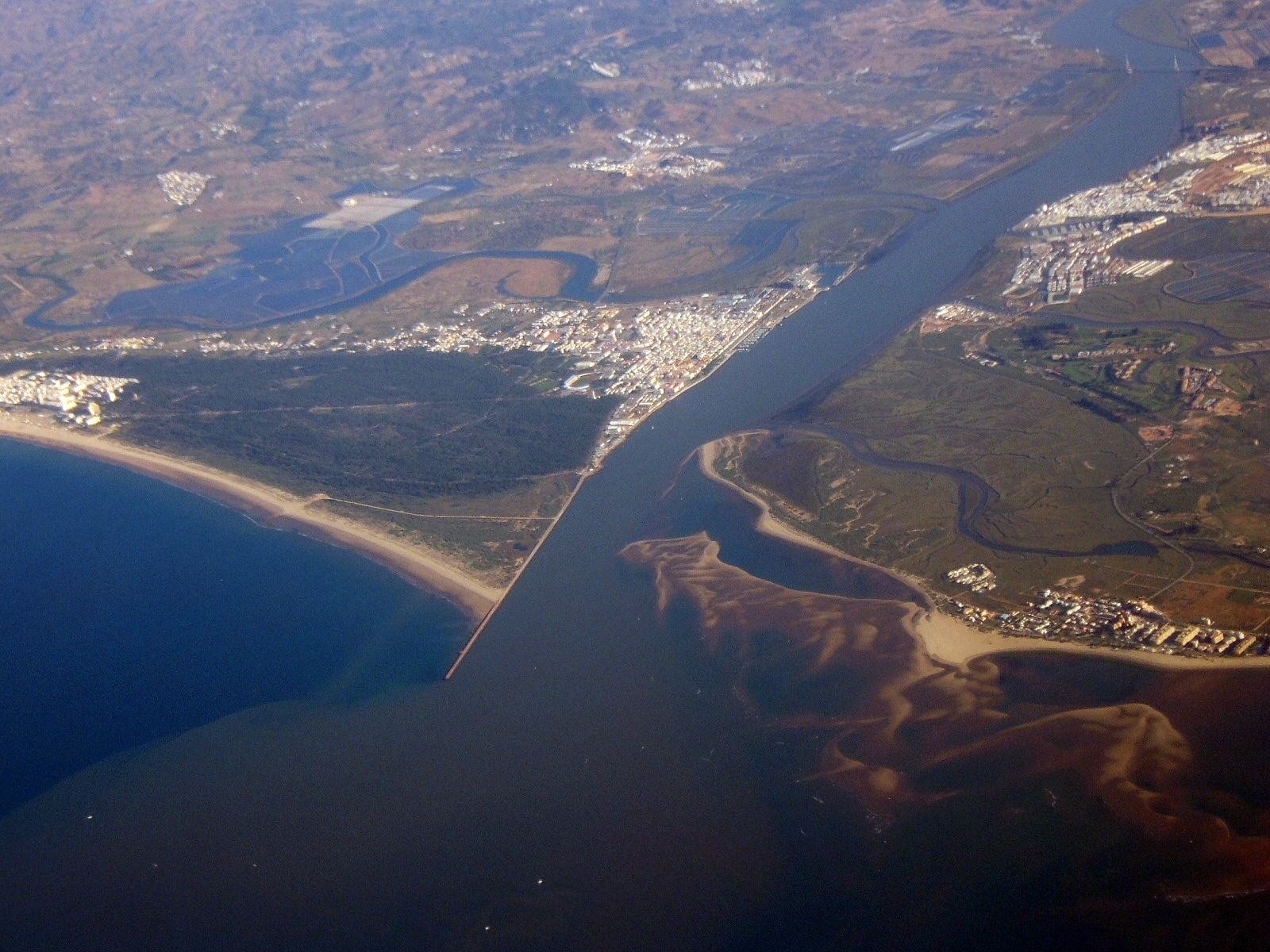
The mouth of the Guadiana river and the city of Vila Real de Santo António (center). Also Monte Gordo (left), Castro Marim (upper center), Ayamonte (upper right) and Isla Canela (lower right)

=== Physical geography ===
The municipality is bordered to the north by the municipality of Castro Marim and to the west by the municipality of Tavira. It fronts the Atlantic Ocean to the south, and the Guadiana River to the east, along with its frontier border with the Andalusian municipality of Ayamonte (Spain). Due to its Atlantic frontage, the municipality has several kilometers of continuous sandy beaches.

The topography of the municipality is diverse. Marshes are common, especially north of the city where a section of the salty wetlands became the Castro Marim and Vila Real de Santo António Marsh Natural Reserve (established in 1975, this was continental Portugal's first nature reserve). Woodlands cover the planar civil parishes of Vila Real de Santo António and Monte Gordo, while in Vila Nova de Cacela, barren lands and schist hills are more predominant. The easternmost part of the Ria Formosa system of lagoons is located in this civil parish.

==== Ecoregions/Protected areas ====
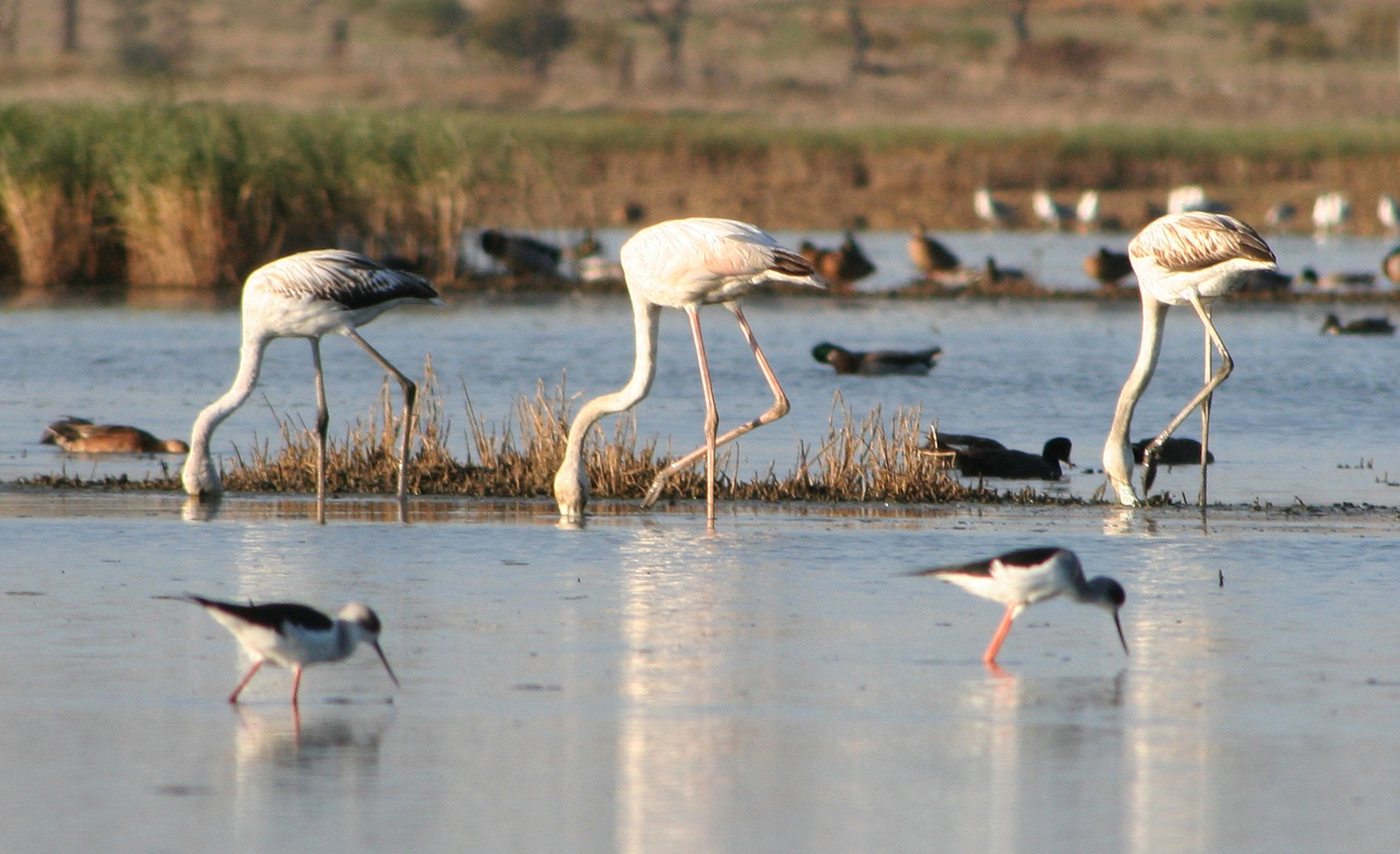
Fauna at Natural Reserve

The establishment, in 1975, of the Castro Marim and Vila Real de Santo António Marsh Natural Reserve provided a refuge for several species of migratory and marine birds, namely mallards, flamingos, Kentish plovers, little terns, pied avocets, dunlins, stilts, white storks, and spoonbills, while at the same time protecting breeding grounds for local fish and crustaceans. Chameleons, oysters, and jellyfish (of the genus Rhopilema) are among the species that can be found in the region and its coastal waters, while carob trees, gum rockrose, brooms and almond trees mingle within the forests and brush within the interior.

=== Climate ===
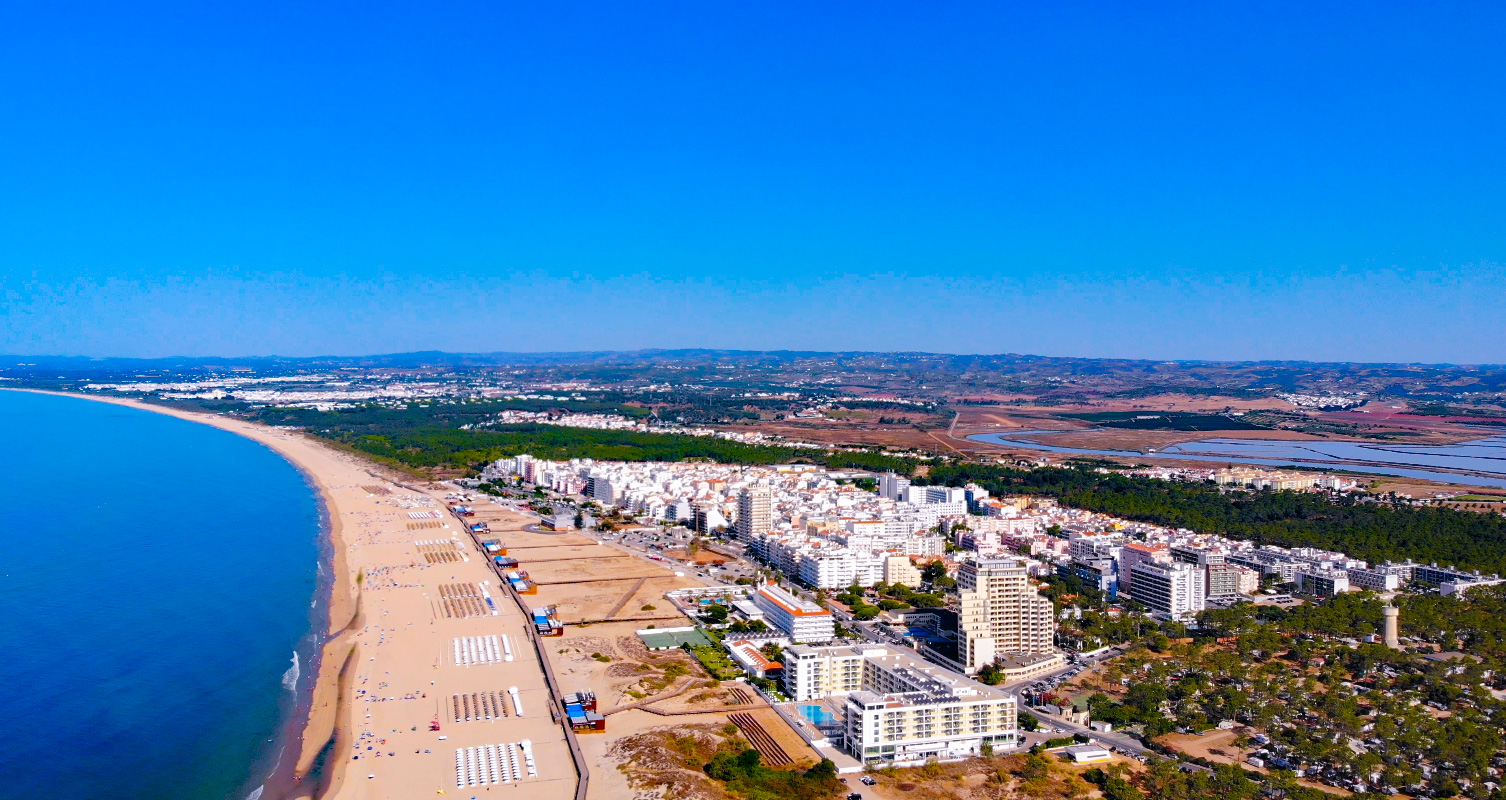
Monte Gordo Beach

Vila Real de Santo António has a Mediterranean climate (Köppen: Csa) with short, mild winters and hot, dry summers. November and December are the rainiest months, although on average, the municipality has around 300 sunny days a year. It has, in general, the hottest summer temperatures and coolest winters of the Algarvian coast.

Climate data for Vila Real de Santo António, normals (1991-2020), extremes (1981-present)
Month	Jan	Feb	Mar	Apr	May	Jun	Jul	Aug	Sep	Oct	Nov	Dec	Year
Record high °C (°F)	24.4 (75.9)	27.2 (81.0)	30.7 (87.3)	32.9 (91.2)	37.8 (100.0)	40.0 (104.0)	44.4 (111.9)	41.7 (107.1)	39.0 (102.2)	34.1 (93.4)	29.4 (84.9)	22.5 (72.5)	44.4 (111.9)
Mean daily maximum °C (°F)	15.7 (60.3)	16.8 (62.2)	19.2 (66.6)	21.2 (70.2)	24.1 (75.4)	27.6 (81.7)	30.5 (86.9)	30.4 (86.7)	27.2 (81.0)	23.4 (74.1)	19.1 (66.4)	16.5 (61.7)	22.6 (72.8)
Daily mean °C (°F)	11.3 (52.3)	12.3 (54.1)	14.6 (58.3)	16.5 (61.7)	19.2 (66.6)	22.4 (72.3)	24.9 (76.8)	25.1 (77.2)	22.5 (72.5)	19.2 (66.6)	15.0 (59.0)	12.4 (54.3)	18.0 (64.3)
Mean daily minimum °C (°F)	7.0 (44.6)	7.8 (46.0)	10.0 (50.0)	11.7 (53.1)	14.3 (57.7)	17.3 (63.1)	19.4 (66.9)	19.7 (67.5)	17.8 (64.0)	15.0 (59.0)	11.0 (51.8)	8.3 (46.9)	13.3 (55.9)
Record low °C (°F)	−2.0 (28.4)	−1.2 (29.8)	0.5 (32.9)	1.0 (33.8)	4.0 (39.2)	6.0 (42.8)	9.5 (49.1)	10.5 (50.9)	8.2 (46.8)	4.5 (40.1)	1.4 (34.5)	−0.5 (31.1)	−2.0 (28.4)
Average precipitation mm (inches)	46.2 (1.82)	42.6 (1.68)	44.3 (1.74)	40.3 (1.59)	25.1 (0.99)	3.9 (0.15)	0.5 (0.02)	2.2 (0.09)	18.5 (0.73)	45.6 (1.80)	69.1 (2.72)	78.4 (3.09)	416.8 (16.41)
Average precipitation days (≥ 1 mm)	6.4	5.1	5.5	4.9	4.2	0.7	0.2	0.2	2.1	6.1	6.1	6.3	47.9
Source: Instituto Português do Mar e da Atmosfera

=== Human geography ===
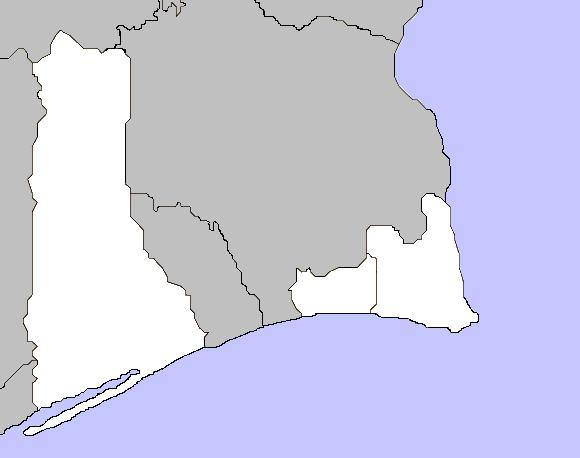
The distribution of Vila Real de Santo António, showing (from left to right): Vila Nova de Cacela, Monte Gordo and Vila Real do Santo António parishes

Population of Vila Real de Santo António (1801 - 2011)
Year	Pop.	±%
1801	2,112	—
1849	3,953	+87.2%
1900	9,817	+148.3%
1930	12,313	+25.4%
1960	14,999	+21.8%
1981	16,347	+9.0%
1991	14,400	−11.9%
2001	17,956	+24.7%
2004	18,158	+1.1%
2011	19,156	+5.5%

Vila Real de Santo António is one of the most densely populated municipalities of the Algarve, with a population density above the national average. Administratively, the municipality is divided into 3 civil parishes (freguesias):

- Vila Real de Santo António - this civil parish contains the city of Vila Real de Santo António which in turn is the seat of the municipality;
- Monte Gordo - the civil parish includes the seaside town and tourist resort of Monte Gordo, which is located less than three kilometers from the city of Vila Real de Santo António and separated by a large section of woodland.
- Vila Nova de Cacela - this civil parish is a (rare) exclave of Portugal; it is separated from the other two civil parishes by the parishes of Altura and Castro Marim (both comprising the municipality of Castro Marim), effectively splitting Cacela from the rest of the municipality. The town of Vila Nova de Cacela was formed in 1927 when the seat of the civil parish was transferred from Cacela Velha (then known as simply "Cacela") to a new urban agglomeration formed by the villages of Bornacha, Buraco and Coutada. The town and popular seaside resort of Manta Rota is located in this civil parish, next to Cacela Island (which is actually a peninsula).

== Economy ==
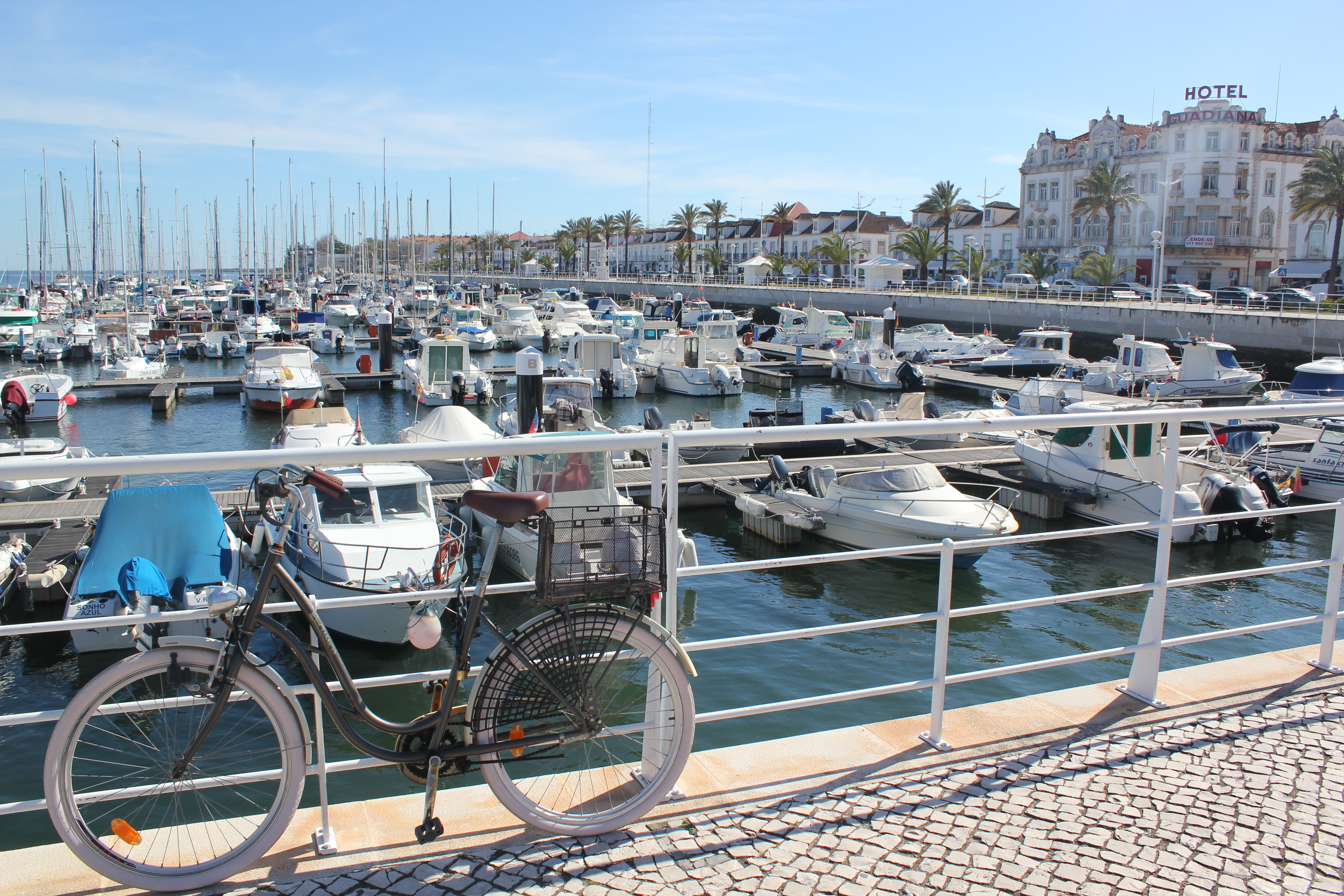
Marina of Vila Real de Santo António

Tuna and sardine fisheries continue to be important to the economy of the region. However, the fish industry went into decline in the 1960s and tourism quickly took over as the economic engine of the municipality, attracting both national and international tourists, especially during the warm season. The tertiary sector, particularly administration/government services and support industries are concentrated in the parish of Vila Real. It is common for inhabitants to commute to Spain for work in the Ayamonte area.

=== Transportation ===
Vila Real de Santo António station is the eastern terminus of the railway from Faro and Lagos. The Portuguese Railways operate a direct train service (using Diesel multiple units) to Lagos with connections to mainline electric trains at Faro.

The municipality's close proximity to the main A22 roadway enables easy access west, to other parts of the country, or into Spain. Despite the opening of the Guadiana International Bridge in 1991, the small car ferry across the river still operates.

The nearest airport is Faro Airport, located 65 km (40 mi) to the south west of Vila Real de Santo António.

== Culture ==
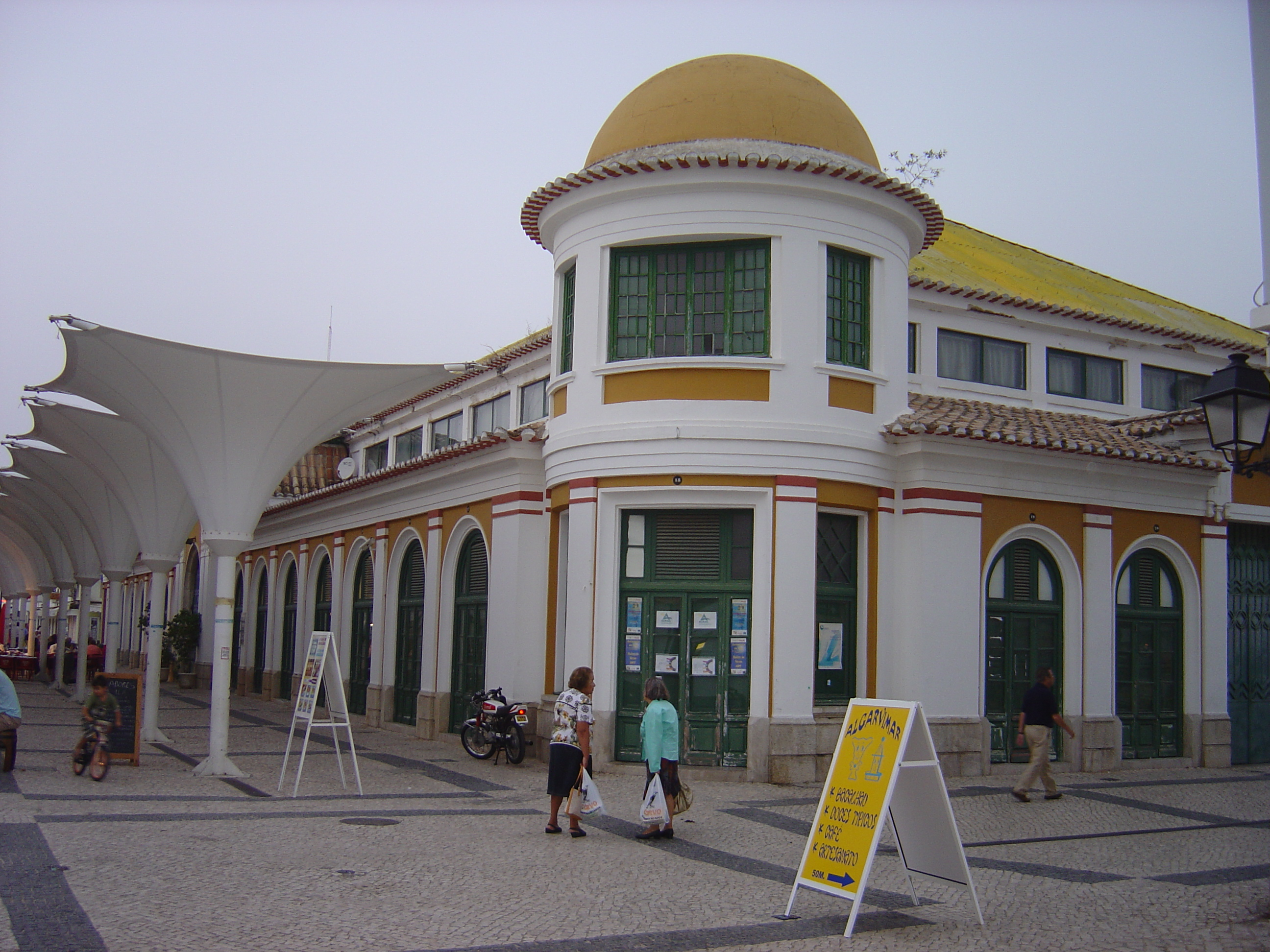
António Aleixo Cultural Center

Several artists were born and/or worked in Vila Real de Santo António, providing a rich heritage in literature and visual arts. The native poet António Aleixo was particularly prominent. Xylographer Manuel Cabanas stood out in the city's artistic panorama and was a fierce opponent of the Portuguese dictatorship.

== Sport ==
The Vila Real Complexo Desportivo is a centre for national- and international-level high-performance training camps, with several sporting clubs using it for athletic preparation. Located near the town of Monte Gordo, it is situated near other sporting facilities and lodgings.

== Notable people ==
- Lutegarda Guimarães de Caires (1858–1935), a Portuguese women's rights activist and poet
- António Fernandes Constantino Aleixo (1899–1949), a poet
- Domiciano Cavém (1932–2005), a footballer with 279 caps with Benfica
- Manuel José (born 1946), a Portuguese football manager
- Mário Centeno (born 1966), a former Minister of Finance, former president of the Eurogroup, and current Governor of the Bank of Portugal.
- Amaro Antunes (born 1990), a professional cyclist that has won the 2020 and 2021 editions of the Tour of Portugal
