= Molly Menchel =

American soccer player (born 1991)

Personal information
- Full name: Molly Elaine Menchel
- Date of birth: December 5, 1991 (age 34)
- Place of birth: Alexandria, Virginia, United States
- Height: 5 ft 4 in (1.63 m)
- Position: Defender

Team information
- Current team: Eskilstuna United
- Number: 11

College career
Years	Team	Apps	(Gls)
2010–2013	Virginia Cavaliers	96	(13)

Senior career*
Years	Team	Apps	(Gls)
2014	Washington Spirit	0	(0)
2014–2016	Røa IL	22	(3)
2016	FC Kansas City	3	(0)
2016–2017	Apollon Limassol		
2018	Eskilstuna United	1	(0)
- * Club domestic league appearances and goals as of April 14, 2018

Molly Elaine Menchel (born December 5, 1991) is an American retired soccer player who most recently played as a defender for Swedish club Eskilstuna United DFF.

== College career ==
Menchel played four seasons for the Virginia Cavaliers, recording 96 appearances and scoring 13 goals. She earned several honors including an ACC All-Academic Team and ACC All-Tournament Team in 2011.

== Club career ==
After playing a couple of seasons with D.C. United Women and Washington Spirit Reserves at W-League, Menchel was picked by the Washington Spirit in the 3rd round of the 2014 NWSL College Draft. In 2014, Menchel signed with Røa IL of Toppserien, the top tier division of women's soccer in Norway. In 2016, she signed with FC Kansas City. In the same year, Menchel signed with Apollon Limassol of the Cypriot First Division.
