= Marisa Abegg =

American soccer player (born 1987)

Personal information
- Full name: Marisa Rene Abegg
- Date of birth: March 14, 1987 (age 39)
- Place of birth: Anchorage, Alaska, United States
- Height: 5 ft 7 in (1.70 m)
- Position: Defender

College career
Years	Team	Apps	(Gls)
2005–2008	Stanford Cardinal		

Senior career*
Years	Team	Apps	(Gls)
2009	FC Gold Pride	6	(0)
2010	Washington Freedom		
2011–2012	D.C. United Women	9	(0)
2013	Gulf Coast Texans		
2013	Washington Spirit	5	(0)

International career
2005–2006	United States U-20		
2007–2008	United States U-23	7	(0)
- * Club domestic league appearances and goals

Marisa Rene Abegg (born March 14, 1987) is an American retired soccer defender. After a successful college career at the Stanford Cardinal women's soccer team, she captained D.C. United Women in 2011 and 2012. Abegg retired in 2014 to focus on her education in healthcare.

== Early career ==
She attended Lakeridge High School in Lake Oswego, Oregon.

== College career ==
=== Stanford University ===
Abegg played for the Stanford Cardinal women's soccer team from 2005 to 2008, starting in all ninety-one matches that Stanford played during her college career and scoring three goals. Abegg was a three-year captain at Stanford University and a MAC Hermann Trophy semifinalist.

== Professional career ==
=== FC Gold Pride, 2009-2010 ===
Abegg was drafted by FC Gold Pride at the 2009 WPS Draft. Despite being promoted from the developmental roster to the full squad, Abegg was deemed surplus to requirements at season's close by Albertin Montoya. She appeared for FC Gold Pride in 6 games.

=== Washington Freedom, 2010 ===
In 2010, Abegg was picked up by Washington Freedom as a developmental player.

=== D.C. United Women, 2011-2012 ===
In 2011 and 2012 she played for D.C. United Women of the W-League, and in early 2013 for the Gulf Coast Texans of the Women's Premier Soccer League. Abegg captained D.C. United Women in both 2011 and 2012.

=== Washington Spirit, 2013-2014 ===
On July 31, 2013, Abegg signed with the Washington Spirit in the National Women's Soccer League (NWSL) as a free agent. She made a debut with the team later that night in a 3–0 loss to the Western New Flash.

She retired from the Washington Spirit on February 14, 2014. In total for the Washington Spirit she started four games out of five appearances, recording 409 minutes of total play.

== International career ==
Abegg was a member of the U-20 and U-23 U.S. women's national teams.

== Retirement ==
On February 14, 2014 Marisa stated her retirement from professional soccer. She planned to put her education first and help people in need through healthcare.

Abegg is now working as the Director of Operation for Women's Soccer at San Diego State University. According to their website, she is entering her third season with the program.

== Career statistics ==
=== Club career ===
Team	Season	League	Domestic League					Domestic Playoffs					Total				
Team	Season	League	Apps	Starts	Minutes	Goals	Assists	Apps	Starts	Minutes	Goals	Assists	Apps	Starts	Minutes	Goals	Assists
FC Gold Pride	2009	WPS	6	3	335	0	0	–	–	–	–	–	6	3	335	0	0
		Total	6	3	335	0	0	–	–	–	–	–	6	3	335	0	0
Career Total		–	6	3	335	0	0	–	–	–	–	–	6	3	335	0	0

=== International career ===
Nation	Year	International Appearances				
Nation	Year	Apps	Starts	Minutes	Goals	Assists
United States U-23	2009	1	0		0	0
Career Total		7	0		0	0
