= Maritha Kaufmann =

Norwegian footballer (born 1981)

Personal information
- Full name: Maritha Ottershagen Kaufmann
- Date of birth: 2 January 1981 (age 45)
- Position: Midfielder

Senior career*
Years	Team	Apps	(Gls)
–2000	Gjelleråsen		
2001–2009	Team Strømmen		

International career
1998	Norway U17	3	(0)
2002–2004	Norway U21	8	(1)
2005–2007	Norway	20	(2)
- * Club domestic league appearances and goals

Maritha Kaufmann (born 2 January 1981) is a Norwegian retired football midfielder who played for Team Strømmen and the Norwegian national team.

== International career ==
Kaufmann was also part of the Norwegian team at the 2005 European Championships.
