= D.C. United Women =

Soccer team

- Full name: D.C. United Women
- Nickname(s): The Black-and-Red
- Founded: 2011
- Stadium: Maryland SoccerPlex
- Capacity: 4,000
- Chairman: William E. Lynch
- Manager: Michael Jorden
- League: USL W-League
- 2012: Division: 1st Conference: 1st Overall: 2nd Playoffs: 3rd
Home colors	Away colors

D.C. United Women was an American soccer club based in Washington, D.C. that competed in the USL W-League, the second tier of women's soccer in the United States. The team was an affiliate of Major League Soccer club, D.C. United but operated independently by Washington Soccer Properties, LLC. To participate in the new professional National Women's Soccer League for the 2013 season, the team reformed as Washington Spirit in December 2012.

== History ==
=== Founding ===
D.C. United Women were announced on March 29, 2011, as part of a partnership with some of the owners of the Northern Virginia Majestics, through a newly founded group named Washington Soccer Properties. As a part of the agreement in for the 2011 season, D.C. United Women competed in the Northeast Division of the W-League Eastern Conference, while the Majestics competed in the Atlantic Division of the Eastern Conference. While Washington Soccer Properties does control most aspects of the team, D.C. United does provide oversight, assistance, and support. Washington Soccer Properties purchased the W-League franchise vacated by Washington Freedom Futures when the team was disbanded following the sale of its senior team Washington Freedom who moved to Boca Raton, Florida and became magicJack. During the off-season between 2011 and 2012, Washington Soccer Properties ownership group severed ties with like owners involved with Northern Virginia Majestics, and operate entirely independently from that team as a result.

=== 2011 season ===
In their first season, D.C. United Women played 10 league games, winning five, drawing three and losing two. They ended the season with four straight victories and finished in third place in the Northeast Division. Defender and co-captain Marisa Abegg was named to the W-League All-Conference Team for the Eastern Conference. For their inaugural season, D.C. United Women's average home attendance for the 2011 season was over 800 fans, with D.C. United Women having five home games at the Maryland SoccerPlex. They won the W-League Rookie Club of the Year award for their performance during the 2011 season.

=== 2012 season ===
For 2012, the W-League's Eastern Conference expanded to a 12-game schedule, and D.C. United Women moved to the Atlantic Division where they played Dayton Dutch Lions, Fredericksburg Impact, Northern Virginia Majestics, and Virginia Beach Piranhas three times each during the regular season. They finished the regular season with eleven wins, no losses, and one draw, good enough for first place in the Atlantic Division and the Eastern Conference and for a tie as W-League regular-season champions with the Pali Blues.

That status gave them hosting rights for the Eastern Conference playoffs, where they defeated the Virginia Beach Piranhas, 3–0, in the semifinals, and the Charlotte Lady Eagles, 3–0, in the final. They went on to the W-League Final Four, where they lost to the host Ottawa Fury, 1–0, then finished third by downing the Quebec City Amiral on penalty kicks, 1–1 (7–6).

The team received the W-League's 2012 Fair Play and Media Awards. Marisa Abegg, Hayley Siegel, and Mikaela Howell made the All-Eastern Conference team. Additionally, Howell made W-League history by being the first player ever to be named to the Team of the Week five weeks in a row, culminating in being named Player of the Week in Week 6 of the season.

== Players and staff ==
=== 2012 roster ===
As of July 27, 2012

Note: Flags indicate national team as defined under FIFA eligibility rules; some limited exceptions apply. Players may hold more than one non-FIFA nationality.

No.	Pos.	Nation	Player
1	GK	(United States) USA	DiDi Haracic
2	DF	(United States) USA	Sarah Sample
3	DF	(United States) USA	Taylor Brown
4	DF	(United States) USA	Madison Brown
5	DF	(United States) USA	Marisa Abegg
6	MF	(United States) USA	Katie Menzie
6	MF	(United States) USA	Jennifer Skogerboe
8	FW	(England) ENG	Mikaela Howell
9	FW	(United States) USA	Tiffany Brown
10	FW	(England) ENG	Lianne Sanderson
11	DF	(United States) USA	Becky Sauerbrunn
12	MF	(United States) USA	Hayley Siegel
13	MF	(United States) USA	Katy Colas
14	DF	(United States) USA	Molly Menchel

No.	Pos.	Nation	Player
15	MF	(United States) USA	Diana Weigel
16	MF	(United States) USA	Holly King
17	MF	(United States) USA	Joanna Lohman
18	MF	(United States) USA	Sam Baker
19	FW	(United States) USA	Ashley Herndon
20	DF	(United States) USA	Jerica DeWolfe
22	FW	(United States) USA	Kristen Schmidbauer
23	FW	(United States) USA	Ashley Manning
24	MF	(United States) USA	Andi Sullivan
27	MF	(United States) USA	Danielle Malagari
28	GK	(United States) USA	Danielle DeLisle
31	MF	(United States) USA	Carolyn Blank
51	MF	(United States) USA	Katie Yensen

=== Coaches ===
- (United States) Michael Jorden 2011–present
- (United States) Cindi Harkes 2011–present

== Season results ==
Season	Regular Season									Playoffs	National Women's Cup	CONCACAF	Top goalscorer(s)	
Season	League	GP	W	L	T	GF	GA	Pts	Pos	Playoffs	National Women's Cup	CONCACAF	Name	Goals
2011	W-League	10	5	3	2	15	9	19	Eastern Conference; Northeast Division; Runners-up				Christine Nairn; Christine Welsh	3
2012	W-League	12	11	0	1	37	8	34	Eastern Conference; Atlantic Division; Winners	Third place				

=== Key ===
Regular season

- GP = Games played
- W = Won
- L = Lost
- T = Tied
- GF = Goals for
- GA = Goals against
- Pts = Points
- Pos = Final position

League

- W-League = USL W-League

National Cup

- QR1 = First Qualifying Round
- QR2 = Second Qualifying Round
- QR3 = Third Qualifying Round
- R1 = First Round
- R2 = Second Round
- R3 = Third Round
- QF = Quarterfinals
- SF = Semifinals
- F = Final

Playoffs

- C-SF = Conference Semifinals
- C-F = Conference Finals
- SF = League Semifinals
- F = League Finals

Champions	Runners-up	Third place	Wooden spoon
