= Cacela Velha =

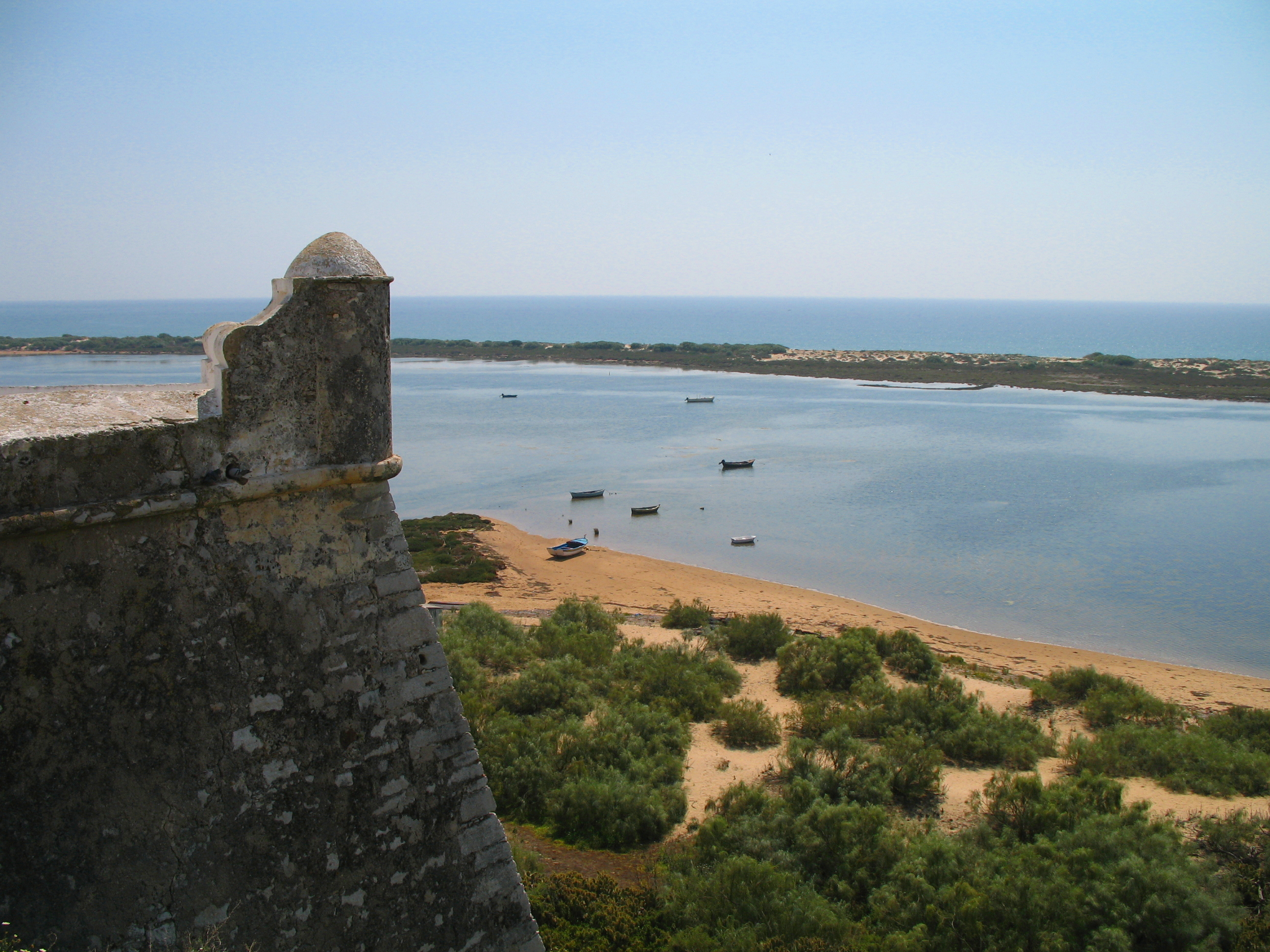
- Cacela Velha Fortress
- Interactive map of Cacela Velha
- Coordinates: 37.1573°N 7.5460°W
- Country: Portugal
- Region: Algarve
- municipality: Vila Real de Santo António
- Civil parish: Vila Nova de Cacela
- Time zone: UTC+0 (GMT)

Cacela Velha (meaning "Old Cacela" in Portuguese) is a village located in the civil parish of Vila Nova de Cacela, municipality of Vila Real de Santo António, Algarve, Portugal. Cacela Velha is situated on top of a hill with a view to the easternmost lagoon of the Ria Formosa. It is the site of the Fortaleza de Cacela.

== History ==
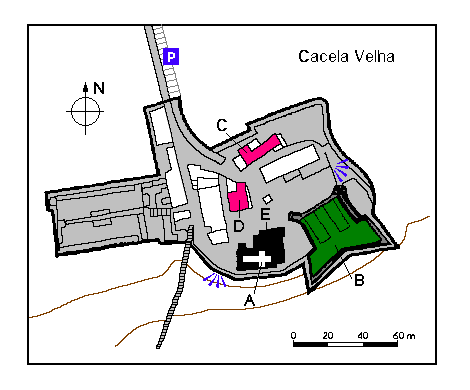
Map of the historic center: A — Main Church; B — Fortress; C — Chamber Houses; D — Priest House; E — Misericórdia

Cacela Velha and the surrounding towns were a stopover for Greek and Phoenician navigators, and according to some authors it may have once been near the location of Conistorgis, the still-unrecovered capital of the Conii. Roman and Arab occupiers also played a significant role in the expansion of the region.

Archeological excavations conducted from May 7 to July 4, 2007, determined the village was the Medina of Qast’alla Daraj (Ibn Darradj al-Qastalli), an Islamic town dating back to the 10th century, when much of the Iberian peninsula was controlled by the Moors and Berbers who arrived from North Africa. Archeologists determined the area was an agricultural center, and part of the excavation recovered seven corn pits that were used for storing cereals and grain.

== Tourism and development ==
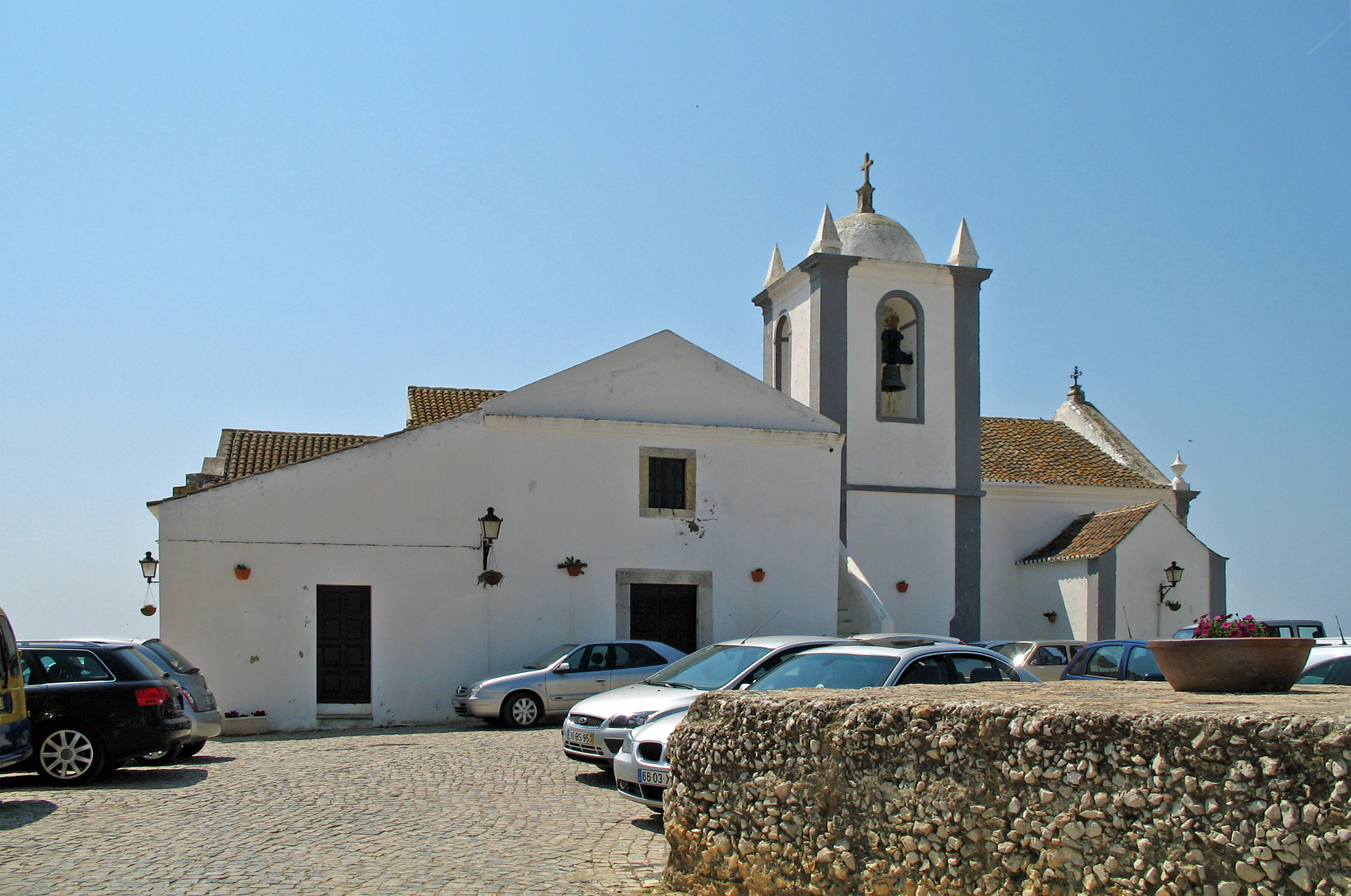
Church of Cacela Velha

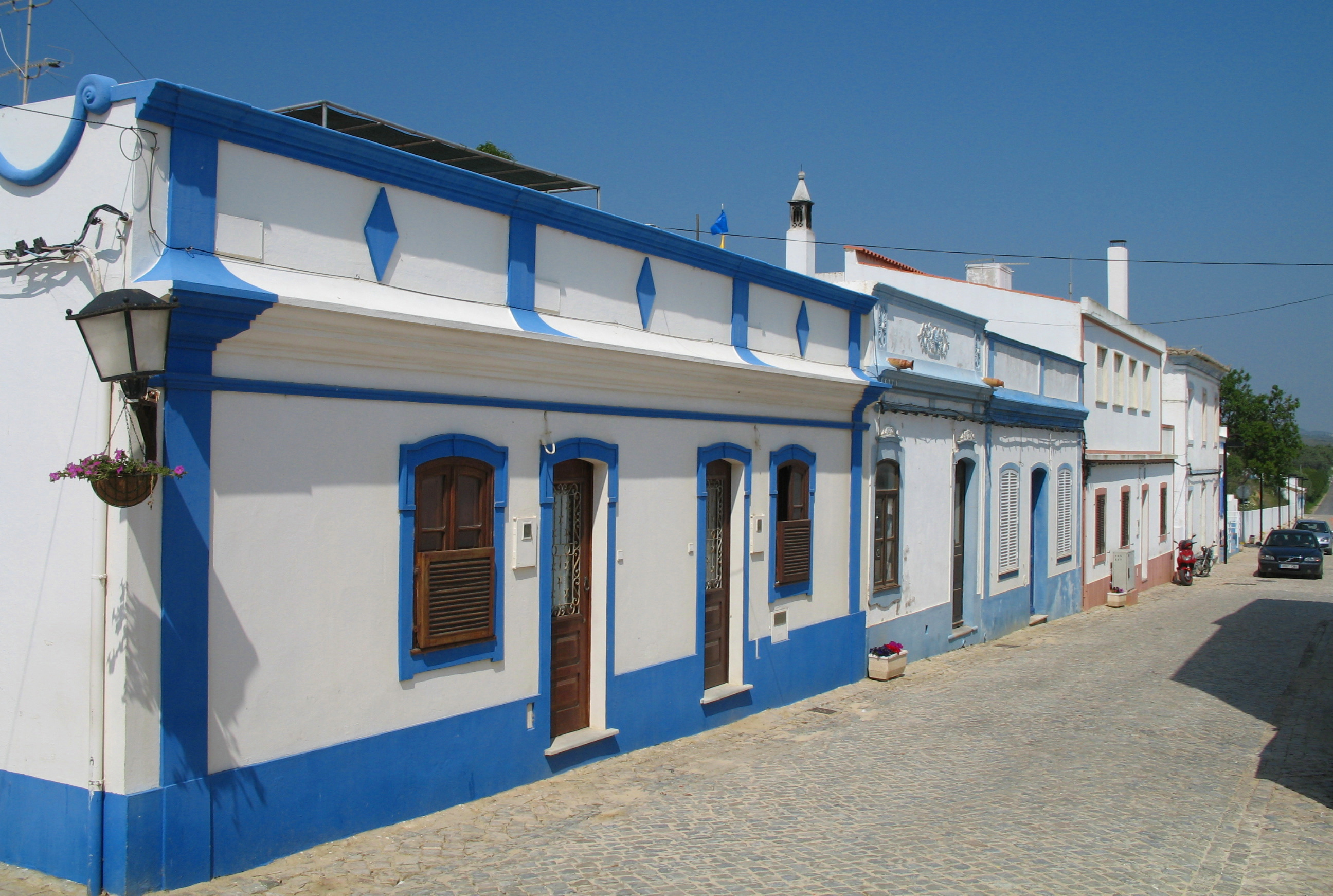
Houses in Cacela Velha

For many years, commercial fishing has been the main source of commerce for Cacela Velha. In recent years, the village has seen additional revenue from being a tourist destination. Cacela Velha’s beachfront location and lack of modern overdevelopment has been attractive to many visitors, while the village's fishing fleets have supplied the local seafood restaurants with oysters, clams, prawns and baby squid.

Cacela Velha’s major cultural event is the annual Noites da Moura Encantada (in English: Nights of the Enchanted Moor Woman), which provides evenings of music, street fairs and artisan exhibitions that pay tribute to the region’s Arab and Berber heritage. Other cultural events include Clássica em Cacela, a concert series at the Church of Cacela Velha and other historical locations which have featured presentations of medieval and contemporary classic music. In 2008, the village saw the opening of its first five-star hotel, the Quinta da Ria.

Cacela Velha beach, in the middle of a small peninsula, is popular among gay tourists.

Cacela Velha is one of ten Portuguese villages that the regional development commission (CCDR) has chosen to renovate in an attempt to encourage more Portuguese residents to relocate to the region.
