= Ria Formosa =

Lagoon in Algarve, Portugal

Coordinates: 36°59′51.5″N 7°51′39.2″W

Ria Formosa Natural Park
- IUCN category V (protected landscape/seascape)
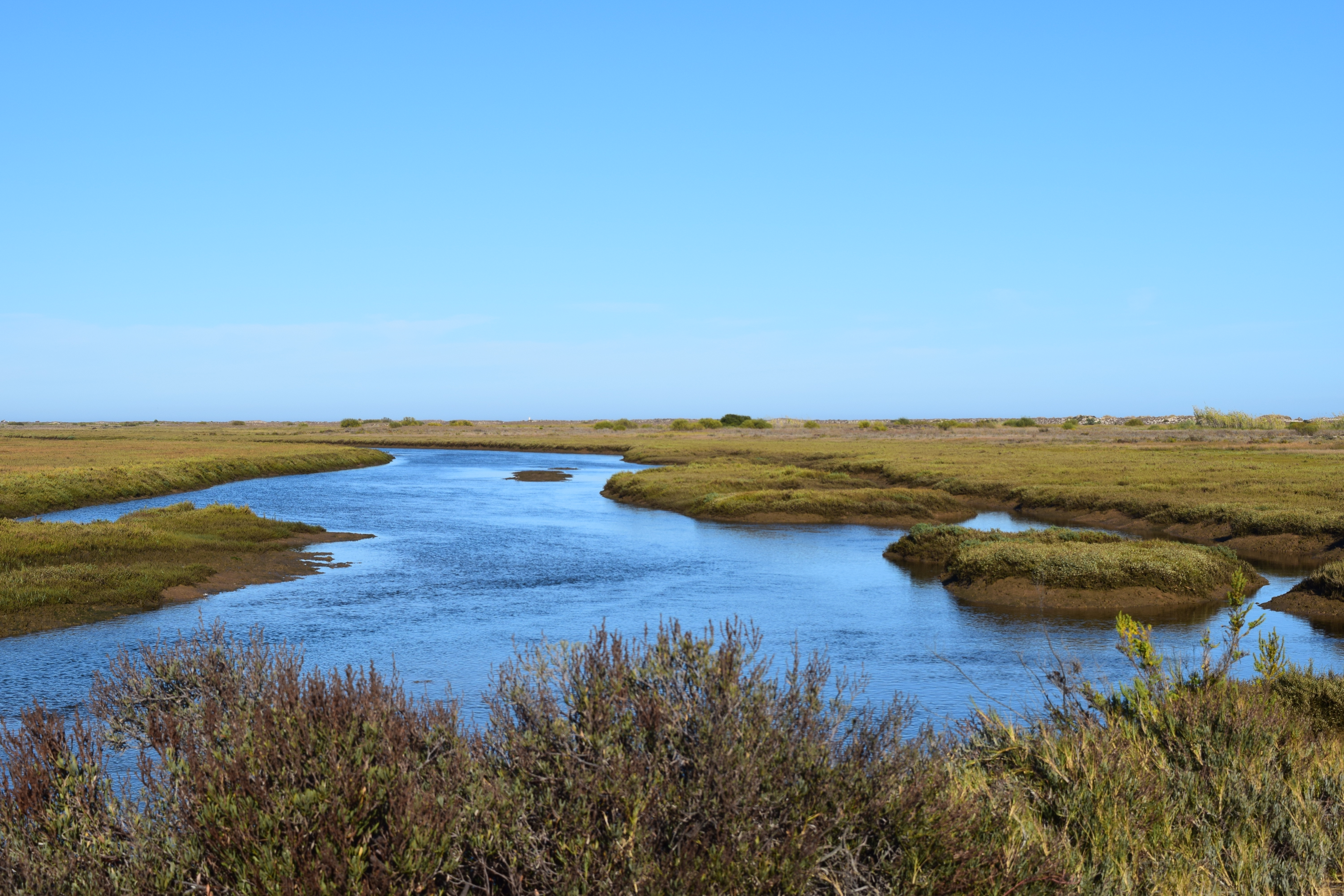
- Interactive map of Ria Formosa Natural Park
- Location: Algarve, Portugal
- Area: 179.01 km^{2} (69.12 sq mi)
- Established: May 2, 1978
- Visitors: 3,280,911 (in 2004)
- Governing body: ICNF
- Website: www.nps.gov/yose/

Ramsar Wetland
- Designated: 24 November 1980
- Reference no.: 212

The Ria Formosa lagoon, located in the Algarve, in southern Portugal, is a system of barrier islands that connects to the sea through six inlets. Five of these inlets are natural and have mobility characteristics. The sixth is an artificial inlet that was opened with the purpose of allowing easier access to the port of Faro. In 2010, the lagoon was recognised as one of the country’s seven natural wonders. Following a public vote in which 656,356 voted, the Ria Formosa was announced the winner of the Marine Area category of the ‘7 Maravilhas Naturais de Portugal’.

Presently the main inlet of the system is the Faro-Olhão inlet, which is an artificial construction. The process started in 1927 but it was only in 1952 that the engineering works were completed and it assumed the present configuration.

Part of the system is a 170 km² protected natural area, but Ria Formosa also plays an important role in the region's economy. Beyond the tourist use the system also supports other economic activities like seafood farms (including grooved carpet shell harvesting) and the port of Faro. Besides being a natural park, Ria Formosa is classified as a Ramsar site. It is also listed by BirdLife International as an Important Bird Area, both in its lagoon area with 23,296 hectares and the oceanic zone with 19,900 hectares. It serves as a stopping place for migratory birds during the spring and autumn migratory periods.

The most important cities near the Ria Formosa are Tavira, Faro and Olhão.

== Entertainment ==
Little villages and towns in the area, such as Cabanas de Tavira, have a large number of bars, cafés and restaurants which are located along the riverfront and are also dotted around a couple of blocks inland. Annually, about 30,000 birds can be observed from Ria Formosa, since the region serves as a migratory corridor and contains some of the last remaining nesting grounds in Europe for some bird species.

There are also some towns in this area, whose names are: Fuzeta (which belongs to the municipality of Olhão), Santa Luzia, Cabanas de Tavira (these last two belonging to Tavira) and Cacela Velha (which belongs to Vila Real de Santo António).

The area is served by public transport from Tavira to Cabanas, namely buses. The nearest train station is in nearby Conceição which is on the Tavira to Vila Real line. Trains stop there daily, but at irregular intervals.

== Islands and beaches ==
Ria Formosa is located in the southernmost portion of the Algarve and continental Portugal and has a mild climate, with sunny days all year round. Because of these features, beaches in the Ria Formosa area are highly regarded. The majority of the islands of the Algarve are part of the wetland. These include Armona Island, Barreta Island, Cacela Island, Culatra Island and Tavira Island. It also hosts small communities such as Quinta do Lago, Cabanas de Tavira, Cacela Velha and Manta Rota. Barril Beach attracts naturists. Tavira Island Beach has a campsite.
