= Castro Marim and Vila Real de Santo António Marsh Natural Reserve =

Nature reserve in southern Portugal

Castro Marim and Vila Real de Santo António Marsh Nature Reserve
- IUCN category IV (habitat/species management area)
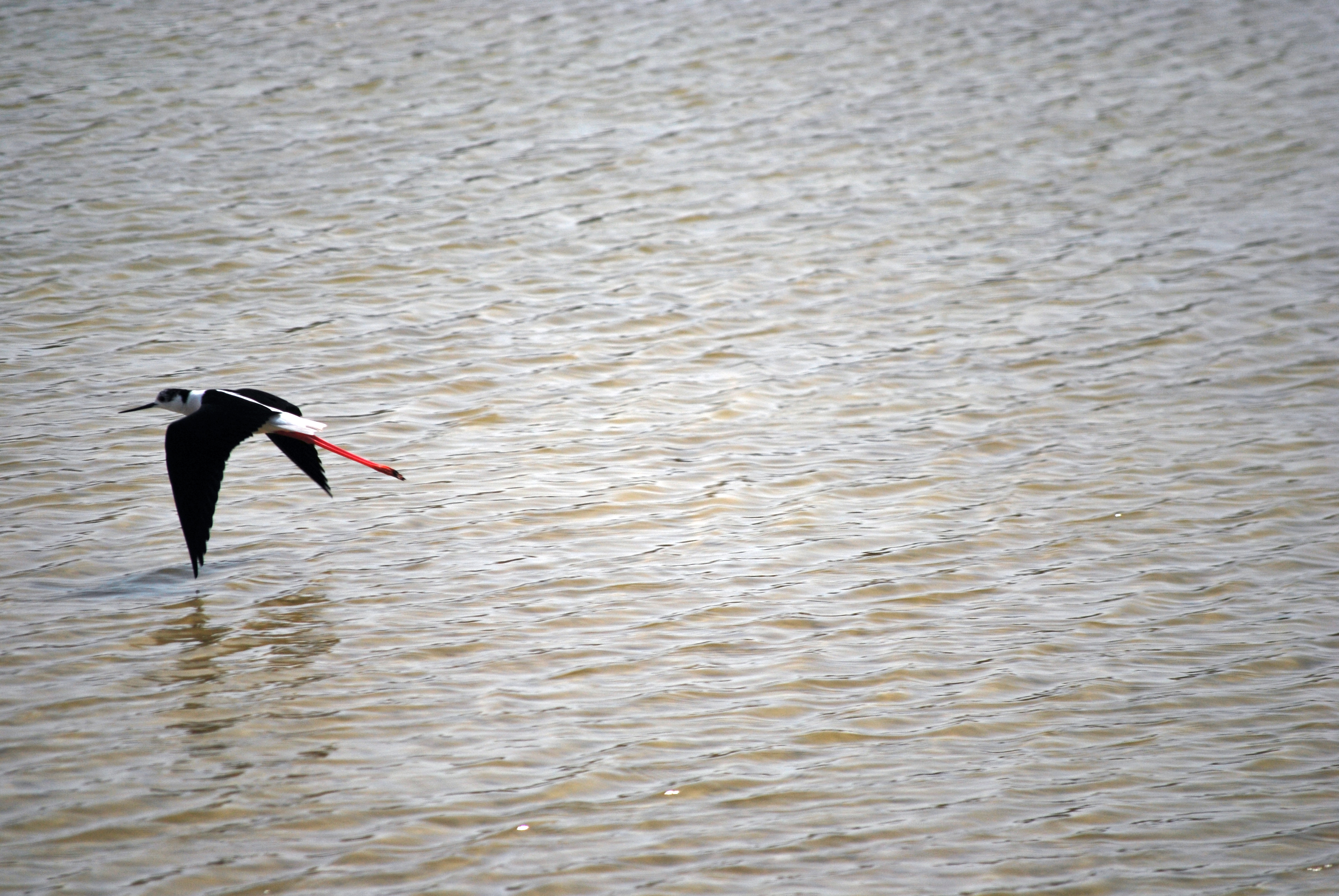

- Location within Portugal
- Location: Algarve, Portugal
- Nearest city: Castro Marim
- Coordinates: 37°12′N 7°26′W
- Area: 23.08 square kilometres (8.91 sq mi)
- Established: 1975

Ramsar Wetland
- Official name: Sapais de Castro Marim
- Designated: 8 May 1996
- Reference no.: 829

Castro Marim and Vila Real de Santo António Marsh Nature Reserve (Portuguese: Reserva Natural do Sapal de Castro Marim e Vila Real de Santo António) is a nature reserve in Portugal. It is a Ramsar wetland. It attracts visitors due to its diverse fauna, which comprises some 153 species of birds, including storks, avocets, sandpipers and flocks of flamingos, as well as more than 400 plant species and various reptiles, amphibians and mammals. In the spring of 2021, 550 flamingos were born at the natural reserve - a first for Portugal.

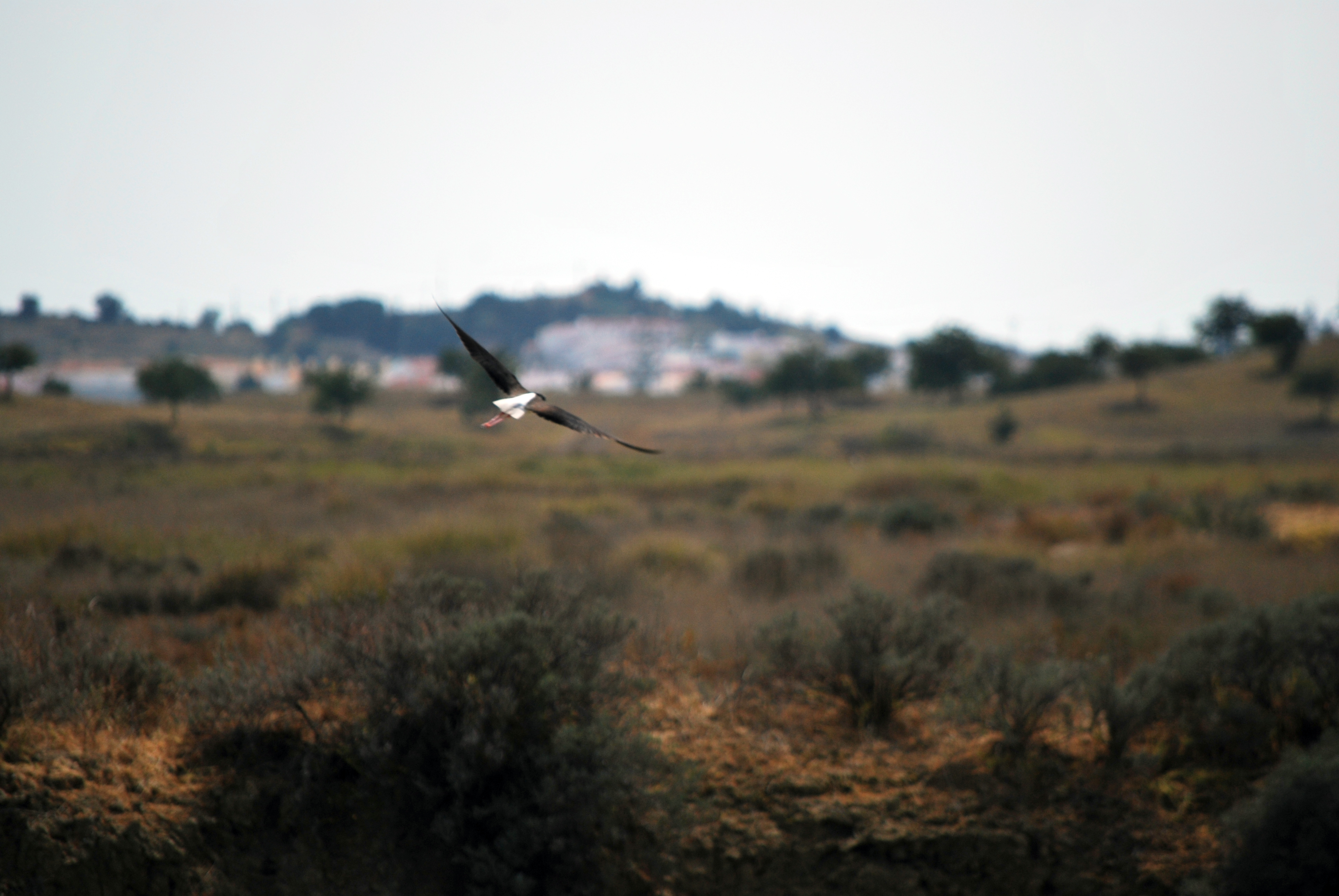

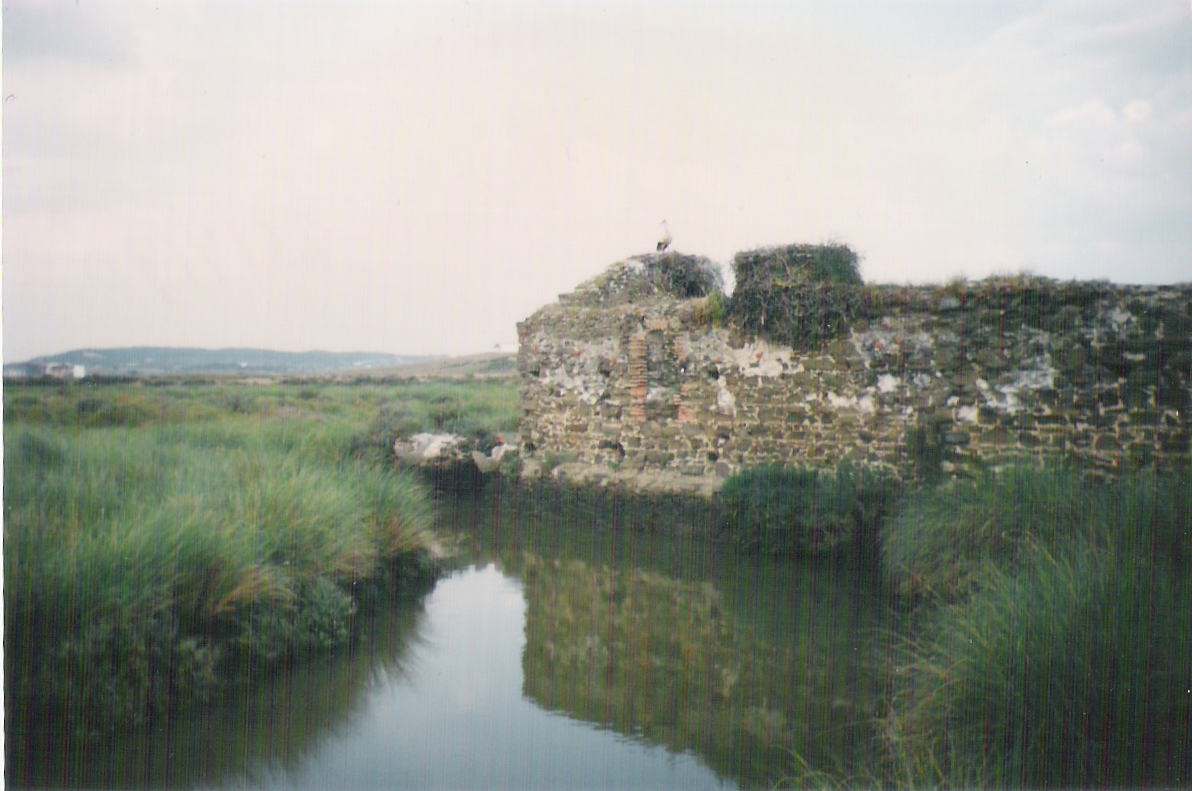

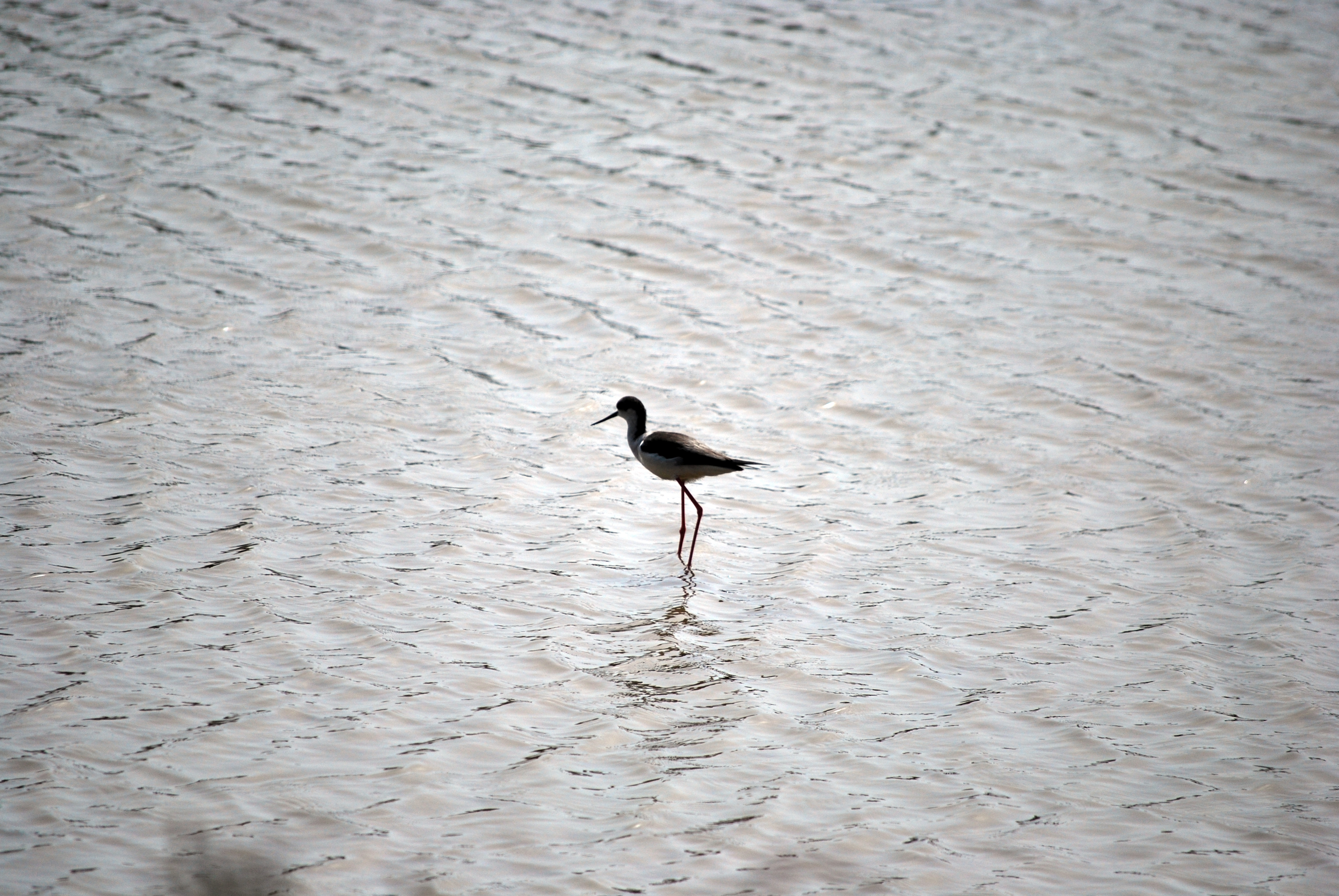
