= Vila Nova de Cacela =

- Civil parish
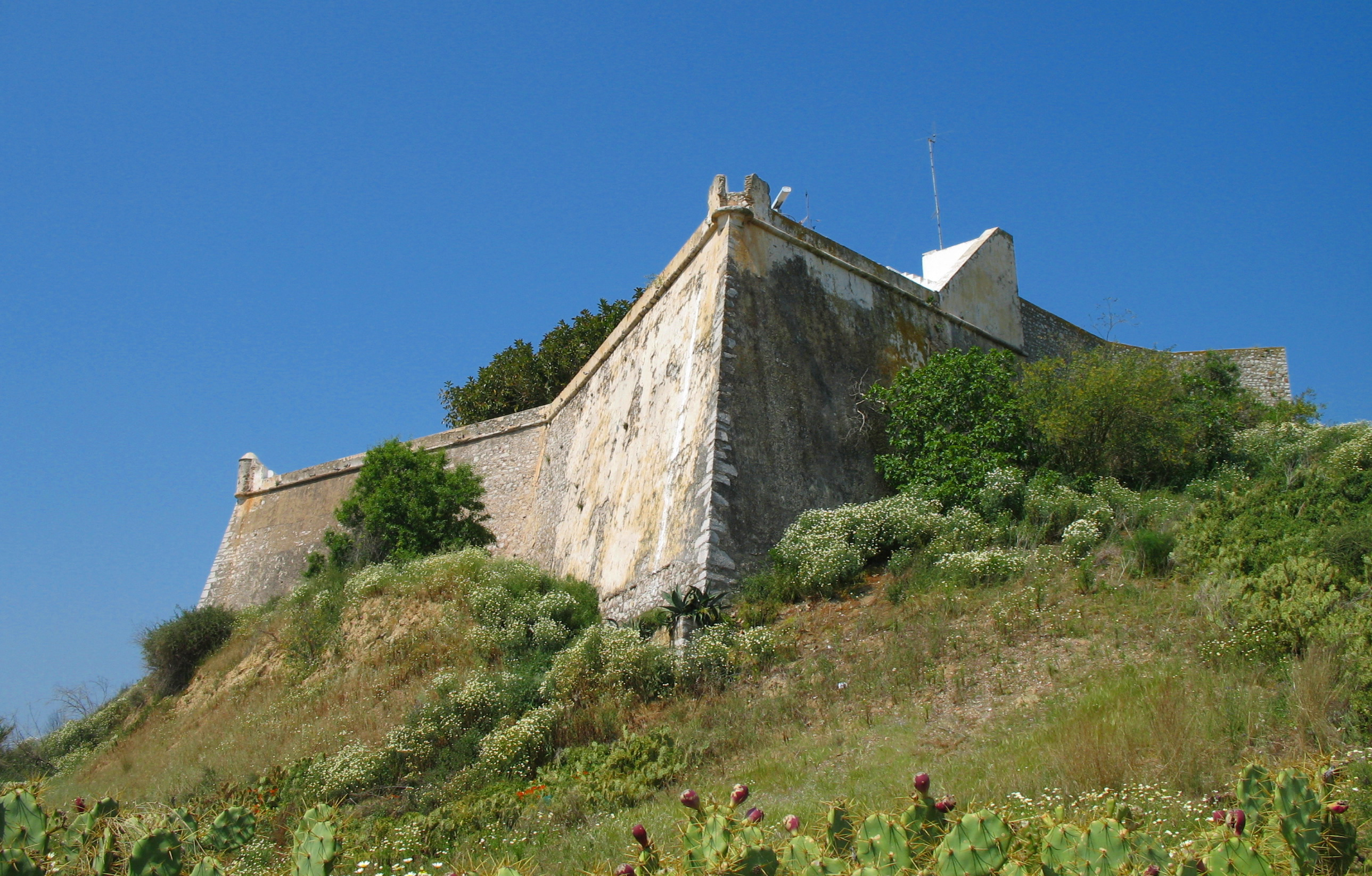

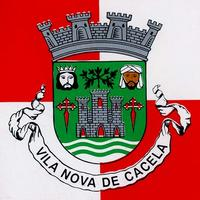
- Flag

- Location in Portugal
- Coordinates: 37.174°N 7.534°W
- Country: Portugal
- Region: Algarve
- Intermunic. comm.: Algarve
- District: Faro
- Municipality: Vila Real de Santo António

Area
  - Total: 46.03 km^{2} (17.77 sq mi)

Population (2011)
  - Total: 3,903
  - Density: 84.79/km^{2} (219.6/sq mi)
- Time zone: UTC+00:00 (WET)
  - Summer (DST): UTC+01:00 (WEST)

Vila Nova de Cacela, or simply Cacela, is a town and Civil parish in the municipality of Vila Real de Santo António, the southeasternmost of the Algarve, Portugal. The population in 2011 was 3,903, in an area of 46.03 km². Cacela is an exclave of the municipality of Vila Real de Santo António, one of only three in Portugal to have exclaves.

A lagoon and popular beaches exist by the coast of this civil parish. It is also the site of the eighteenth-century Fortaleza de Cacela.
