= Tierney =

Tierney /ˈtɪərni/ is an Irish surname, and a female given name.

The name is an Anglicized form of the Irish language surname Ó Tiarnaigh (literally "Descendant of Tiarnach"; historically spelt Ó Tighearnaigh), derived from tiarna, the Irish word for 'lord' or 'master'. It is sometimes a variant of Tiernan (Irish: Mac Tiarnáin).

== Families ==
Five unrelated families of the name arose in Gaelic Ireland, in what is now County Clare, County Mayo, County Monaghan, County Meath, and County Tipperary.

=== Ó Tighearnaigh of Cenél nEógain ===
This family lived in the territory of Fearnmuigh or Fearnmaigh [which means 'the territory of the plain'], in an area in South Monaghan/South Armagh that is the present Barony of Farney, whose principal town is Carrickmacross.

=== Ó Tighearnaigh of Uí Fiachrach Muaidhe ===
This family were Lords of Carra. Almost the only family member recorded in the annals was Flann Ó Tighearnaigh. Gilbert Ó Tigernaig, Bishop of Annaghdown (1306–1323), was also a member of this family.

=== Ó Tighearnaigh of Brega ===
This family claimed descent from Tigernach mac Fócartai (died 865), one of the Kings of Brega. They were a branch of the southern Uí Néill. "The Kingdom is said to have stretched from Birr in County Offaly to the Hill of Uishneach in Westmeath. Tighearnach resided at the Great Crannóg of Lagore, which is situated near Ratoath in County Meath, not far from Dublin. Tighearnach led the Irish to a great victory over the Norse Vikings in 848 A.D."

=== Ó Tighearnaigh of Ormond ===
A family of the name resided in Ormond, now County Tipperary. Their origins are obscure. New research now confirms that this family was indeed an indigenous sept. Their seat was in the townland of Park and their lands, Fearann Ó Tighearnaigh, took in most of the present-day townlands of Ballymackey, Ballyknockane, Carrowea, Clash, Falleen, Gortnadrumman, Kilgorteen and Knockane.

=== Ó Tighearnaigh of Corcu Modruad ===
This is an area in northern County Clare. This sept were hereditary priests and monks.

== Notable people with the surname ==
=== In arts and media ===
- Brian Tierney (medievalist) (1922–2019), historian and medievalist
- Mark Aloysius Tierney (1795–1862), English Catholic historian
- Patrick Lennox Tierney (1914–2015), art historian, specialist on Japan
- Tom Tierney (artist) (1928–2014), American paper doll artist
- Maureen Jordan Tierney (artist)(1963- ) Baltimore MD, USA found object sculpture and environmental activist

==== Film, television, and theatre ====
- Eileen Wilson Powell (1894–1942), American actress born Julia Mary Tierney
- Gene Tierney (1920–1991), American stage and film actress
- Gerard "Jerry" Tierney (1924–1985), American actor known as Scott Brady
- Jacob Tierney (born 1979), Canadian actor, film director and writer
- Kevin Tierney (1950–2018), Canadian film producer
- Lawrence Tierney (1919–2002), Irish-American actor
- Malcolm Tierney (1938–2014), British actor
- Matt Tierney, American sound designer for theatre
- Maura Tierney (born 1965), American actress

==== In music ====
- Andrew Tierney (born 1974), Australian singer-songwriter of band Human nature
- Garrett Tierney, bass guitar and vocals in band 'brand new'
- Harry Tierney (1890–1965), American composer of musical theatre
- Michael Tierney (musician) (born 1977), member of Australian band Human Nature
- Mick Pyro, Irish musician, born Michael Tierney
- Vivian Tierney (born 1957), English operatic soprano

==== In other media ====
- Gerard Tierney (1924–1979), Irish bi-lingual radio broadcaster
- John Tierney (journalist) (born 1953), American journalist
- Matthew Tierney (poet) (born 1970), Canadian poet
- Patrick Tierney (author), American writer and mountaineer
- Richard L. Tierney (1936–2022), American writer
- Robert J. Tierney, Australian linguist and author
- Ronald Tierney (1944–2017), American newspaper editor and author
- Tierney Gearon (born 1963), American photographer

=== Government, law, and politics ===
- Darren Tierney, British civil servant, Permanent Secretary of the Office for National Statistics
- Frank A. Tierney, Deputy Commissioner under the Workmen's Compensation act
- Gayle Tierney, Australian politician, Labor party
- George Tierney (1761–1830), English Whig politician
- James Tierney (politician) (born 1947), Attorney General of Maine
- James Tierney Jr. American republican politician, Representative from New Hampshire
- John Tierney (Australian politician) (born 1946), Liberal senator
- John Tierney (Irish politician) (born 1951)
- John F. Tierney (born 1951), United States Representative from Massachusetts
- John H. Tierney (1832–1907), American politician and farmer
- John J. Tierney (1926–2005), American Boston city council member
- Joseph M. Tierney (1941–2009), American politician, father of Maura Tierney
- Michael Tierney (politician) (1894–1975), professor at University College Dublin
- Patrick Tierney (Irish politician) (1904–1990), Irish Labour party politician
- Peter Tierney Murrell (born 1964), CEO of the Scottish National Party
- Sir Edward Tierney, 2nd Baronet (June 1780–11 May 1856) Irish lawyer and landowner
- Susan Tierney (born 1951), American academic and Government policy administrator
- Sydney Tierney (1923–2010), British Labour Party politician
- Thomas Tierney (mayor) (1916–1998), Irish mayor of Galway, Ireland
- Thomas M. Tierney (1919–2001), American administrator of the Bureau of Health Insurance
- Tim Tierney (politician) (born 1974), Canadian councillor and politician
- William Tierney Robarts (1786–1820), British politician and businessman
- William L. Tierney (1876–1958), Democratic member of the US House of Representatives

=== In sport ===
==== In football ====
- Chris Tierney (soccer) (born 1986), American footballer
- Fergus Tierney (born 2003), Scottish born Malaysian footballer, Johor Darul Ta'zim III F.C.
- Francis Tierney (born 1975), English footballer with Doncaster Rovers
- Gary Tierney (born 1986), Scottish football (soccer) player
- Grant Tierney (born 1961), Scottish footballer
- Jim Tierney (footballer) (born 1940), Scottish footballer
- Kieran Tierney (born 1997), footballer for Celtic Glasgow, Arsenal
- Lawrie Tierney (1959–2011), Scottish football (soccer) player
- Marc Tierney (born 1985), English footballer (soccer)
- Martin Tierney (born 1966), Scottish footballer (Ayr United) and TV pundit
- Neil Tierney, Australian rugby league footballer
- Paul Tierney (footballer) (born 1982 in England), Irish football (soccer) player
- Ross Tierney (born 2001), Irish footballer
- Ryan Tierney, Scottish footballer
- Sam Tierney (born 1998), English footballer for Leicester City
- Tommy Tierney, English footballer

==== In Gaelic football and hurling ====
- Benny Tierney, Irish Gaelic goalkeeper and sports journalist
- David Tierney (born 1979), Irish hurler and Gaelic footballer
- John Tierney (Gaelic footballer) (born 1982), Gaelic footballer
- Matthew Tierney (Gaelic footballer), Irish Gaelic footballer
- Michael Tierney (Gaelic footballer) (born 1986), from Laois in Ireland
- Noel Tierney (born 1942), Irish Gaelic footballer and sportsperson
- Tom Tierney (Galway hurler) (born 1983), Irish hurler and manager
- Tom Tierney (Kilkenny hurler) (1894–1984), Irish hurler
- Tomás Tierney (born 1961), Irish Gaelic footballer

==== In rugby ====
- Abi Tierney, British, appointed as the first female chief executive of the Welsh Rugby Union in 2023
- Dylan Tierney-Martin (born 1999), Irish rugby union player
- Lewis Tierney (born 1994), Scottish international rugby league player
- Matt Tierney (rugby union) (born 1996), Canadian Rugby union player
- Melbourne Tierney (1923–2014), Welsh rugby league player
- Paul Tierney (rugby league) (1919–1973), Australian rugby league footballer
- Tom Tierney (rugby union), Irish rugby union player

==== In other sports ====
- Bill Tierney (baseball) (1858–1898), with Cincinnati red stockings
- Bill Tierney (born 1952) American lacrosse coach
- Blake Tierney (born 2002) Canadian competitive swimmer
- Chris Tierney (ice hockey) (born 1994), Canadian hockey player
- Cotton Tierney (1894–1953), American baseball second and third baseman
- Erin Tierney (born 1970), Cook Islander female Olympic sprinter
- Festus Tierney (1899–1973), American NFL guard with Toledo Maroons
- Jack Tierney (1893–1968), American basketball player and coach
- Jade Tierney (born 2004), Cook Islander Olympic canoeist
- James Tierney (footballer) (1878–1959), Australian rules footballer
- Joe Tierney (1903–2004), American sprinter at the 1928 Olympics
- John Tierney (cricketer) (born 1964), English cricketer
- John Tierney (rower), American rower
- Meghan Tierney, US Olympic snowboarder
- Paul Tierney (hurler) (born 1982), Irish hurler and ultrarunner
- Shea Tierney (born 1986), American football and coach for New York giants
- Tim Tierney (American football) (1943–2012), American football player and coach
- Trevor Tierney, American lacrosse goaltender and coach

=== In business ===
- Brian Tierney (born 1957), American businessman and newspaper publisher
- Michael Tierney (born 1989), American businessman, founder of Stuffed Puffs
- Paul E. Tierney (born 1943), American business professor and venture capitalist
- Thomas J. Tierney (born 1954), business executive, chairman of eBay

=== In education ===
- Alison J. Tierney (born 1948), British nursing theorist and researcher
- Charles Rust-Tierney (born 1955), American ACLU chapter president
- James Tierney (politician) (born 1947), Attorney General of Maine
- Keith Tierney, Canadian scientist and academic
- Myles Tierney (1937–2017), American mathematician and professor
- Robert J. Tierney, Dean Emeritus at the University of British Columbia
- T. F. Tierney (born 1951), American urbanist, network theorist and educator
- William G. Tierney, American scholar in higher education and author

=== In religion ===
- Cornelius Tierney (1872–1931), Irish priest and missionary
- Gilbert Ó Tigernaig, bishop of Annaghdown
- Michael Tierney (bishop) (1839–1908), Roman Catholic bishop
- Tigernach of Clones (died 549), Irish saint, patron
- Tigernach Ua Braín (died 1088), Abbott of Clonmacnoise

=== In science ===
- James Edward Tierney Aitchison (1835–1898), Scottish surgeon and botanist
- Jessica Tierney (born 1982), American paleoclimatologist
- Luke Tierney, American statistician and computer scientist
- Matthew John Tierney (1776–1845), Irish surgeon and royal physician

=== In other fields ===
- Emiko Ohnuki-Tierney (born 1934), Japanese-American anthropologist
- Flann Ó Tighearnaigh (died 1273), Gaelic Irish lord
- Paul Tierney (referee) (born 1980), English football referee
- Tigernach mac Fócartai (died 865), king of Lagore
- William Tierney Clark (1783–1852), English civil engineer of bridges

== Fictional characters ==
- Kyra Tierney, character in the video game Phantasy Star IV
- Philip Tierney, main protagonist in the 1958 film Terror in the Haunted House
- Rashers Tierney in TV show Strumpet City (miniseries) played by David Kelly
- Ray Tierney, main protagonist in Pride and Glory (film) played by Edward Norton
- Sheila Wayne Tierney, main protagonist in the 1958 film Terror in the Haunted House
- Skye Tierney, character in the Evernight (series) books
- Jack Tierney, character in the film Friday the 13th

== Notable people with the given name ==
- Tierney Gearon (born 1963), American photographer
- Tierney Pfirman (born 1994), American basketball player
- Tierney Sutton (born 1963), American singer
- Tierney Thys (1966-2026), American biologist

== See also ==
- Lawvere–Tierney topology
- Roper-Logan-Tierney model of nursing (published 1980, revised in 1985, 1990 and latest edition 1998)
- Simmons–Tierney bet
- Tigernach (disambiguation)
- Pitt–Tierney duel
