= Tomás Ó Mellaig =

Irish bishop

Tomás Ó Mellaig, Bishop-elect of Annaghdown, fl. 1329.

Ó Mellaig (O'Mellia, Melia) was Elected circa 1328 or 1329, but never consecrated. He was a kinsman of two previous bishops of Annaghdown, Conn Ua Mellaig (died 1202) and Tomas Ó Mellaig, (c.1242-1247/50). According to the Annals of Loch Cé, Tomas Ua Mellan, espuc Enaigh duin, do ecc h-i cuirt an phapa in hoc anno./Thomas O'Mellain, bishop of Enach-dúin, died at the Pope's court Avignon Papacy in hoc anno [1328].

== See also ==
- Pope John XXII, 1316-1334
- Conn Ua Mellaig, Bishop of Annaghdown, died 1202.
- Tomas Ó Mellaig, Bishop of Annaghdown, c.1242-1247/50.
- Careena Melia, actress.
- Cian Melia, Irish showjumper.

Catholic Church titles
Preceded by Albertus	Bishop of Annaghdown; 1329–unknown	Succeeded by Dionysius
