= Blue Dragon =

Blue Dragon may refer to:

== Biology ==
- Glaucus atlanticus, a shell-less marine gastropod mollusc in the family Glaucidae
- Glaucus marginatus, a shell-less marine gastropod mollusc in the family Glaucidae
- Pteraeolidia ianthina, a shell-less marine gastropod mollusc in the family Facelinidae

== Media ==
=== Franchise ===
- Blue Dragon franchise of video games, manga and anime
  - Blue Dragon (video game), a 2006 video game for the Xbox 360.
  - Blue Dragon (manga), also known as Blue Dragon Ral Ω Grad, a manga adaptation of the video game series
  - Blue Dragon (TV series), an anime adaptation of the video game series

=== Books ===
- Blue Dragon, a novel in The Dark Heavens trilogy by Kylie Chan
- The Blue Dragon: A Robert Strand Mystery, a novella by Ronald Tierney
- The Blue Dragon, a novel by Robert Lepage, Marie Michaud, and Fred Jourdain
- The Blue Dragon, a novel by Kirk Munroe
- Blue Dragon, a tavern in Charles Dickens' novel Martin Chuzzlewit

=== Tabletop game ===
- Blue dragon (Dungeons & Dragons), a type of dragon in the Dungeons & Dragons role-playing game

=== Television and film ===
- The Blue Dragon, a 1919 German silent film directed by Harry Piel
- Blue Dragon Awards (disambiguation)
- Blue Dragon, a fictional character from Brave Animated Series by Yellow Book

== Sports ==
- Belgrade Blue Dragons, an American football club based in Belgrade, Serbia
- Cardiff City Blue Dragons, former Rugby League team in Wales
- Hutchinson Blue Dragons, sports teams for Hutchinson Community College in Hutchinson, Kansas, U.S.

== Other ==
- Azure Dragon, also known as Blue Dragon (蒼龍 Cānglóng), one of the Dragon Kings of the Four Seas in Chinese religion
- Blue Dragon (military unit), nickname of 2nd Marine Brigade of Republic of Korea Marine Corps
- Odeleite River, Portugal

== See also ==
- Blue Dragon Children's Foundation, a Non Governmental Organisation based in Hanoi, Vietnam focused on getting children out of the poverty cycle
- Dragon Bleu, a French brand of vodka
