= Conn Ua Mellaig =

Conn Ua Mellaig (died 1202) was the Bishop of Annaghdown.

Ua Mellaig was a native of what is now County Galway, where his surname is now rendered Melia.

He attended the coronation of Richard I of England on 17 September 1189. He died in office in 1202.

Other bearers of the surname at Annaghdown included Bishop Tomas Ó Mellaig (c.1242–1247/50) and bishop-elect Tomás Ó Mellaig (fl. 1329).

== See also ==
- Careena Melia, actress
- Cian Melia, Irish showjumper

Preceded by new creation	Bishop of Annaghdown before 1189–1202	Succeeded by Murchad Ua Flaithbertaig
