= James Tierney =

James Tierney may refer to:

- James Tierney (attorney) (born 1947), legal scholar and former Maine attorney general
- James Tierney (footballer) (1878–1959), Australian rules footballer
- James W. Tierney Jr., member of the New Hampshire House of Representatives
- Jim Tierney (footballer) (born 1940), Scottish footballer
- Cotton Tierney (James Arthur Tierney, 1894–1953), American baseball player
