= Odeleite River =

River in southern Portugal

Coordinates: 37.3281°N 7.4895°W

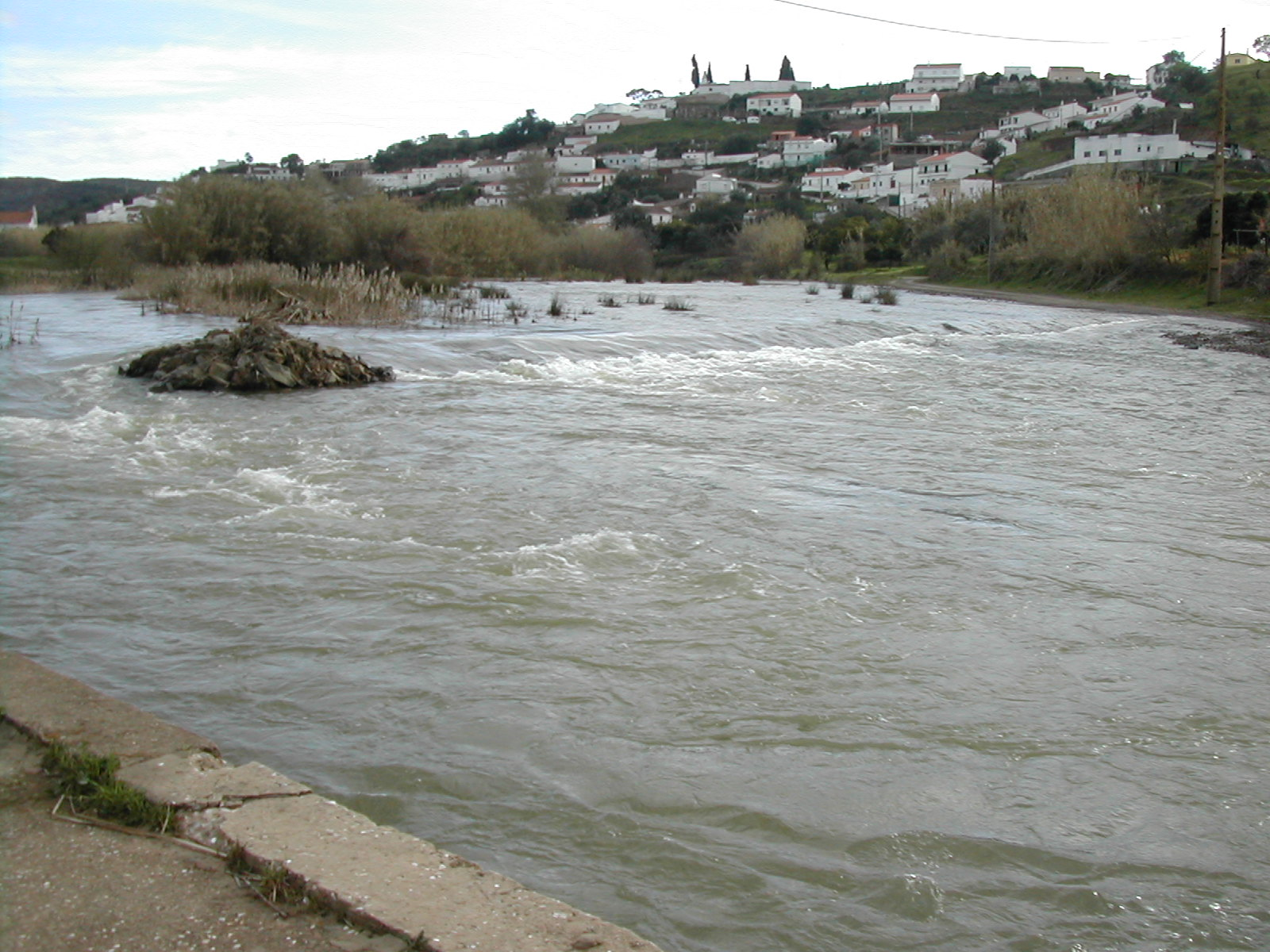

Location
- Country: Portugal
- Region: Algarve

Physical characteristics
- Source: Serra do Caldeirão
- Mouth: River Guadiana

Odeleite (also known as Ribeira de Odeleite) is a river in eastern Algarve, Portugal and a right tributary of the Guadiana. It originates in the mountains of the Serra do Caldeirão, in the municipality of Loulé, and flows eastwards throughout the municipalities of São Brás de Alportel, Tavira, Alcoutim and Castro Marim, where it reaches the Guadiana, near the village of Foz de Odeleite.

The name Odeleite may have originated from the Arabic name "river of milk" (Arabic: wdi al-laban). According to historical accounts, during the period of Islamic rule, the river was known as "Leite" and had a higher water volume compared to present times.

Since 2010, the river has garnered international attention, especially in China, due to its shape, which resembles a dragon. This is a result of the reservoir created by the Odeleite dam, constructed in 1996 to provide water to eastern Algarve (Sotavento Algarvio).

== History ==
The river has supported human settlement since at least the 11th century, with the establishment of an early Islamic rural settlement called Alcariais de Odeleite. The site is located just east of the village of Odeleite, strategically positioned along elevated ridges near the river. It consisted of more than a dozen houses and was developed on terraced platforms along the slopes. Some structures were well-preserved, offering evidence of habitation patterns and resource use closely linked to the river, which likely played a crucial role in sustaining the community.

== Odeleite Dam ==
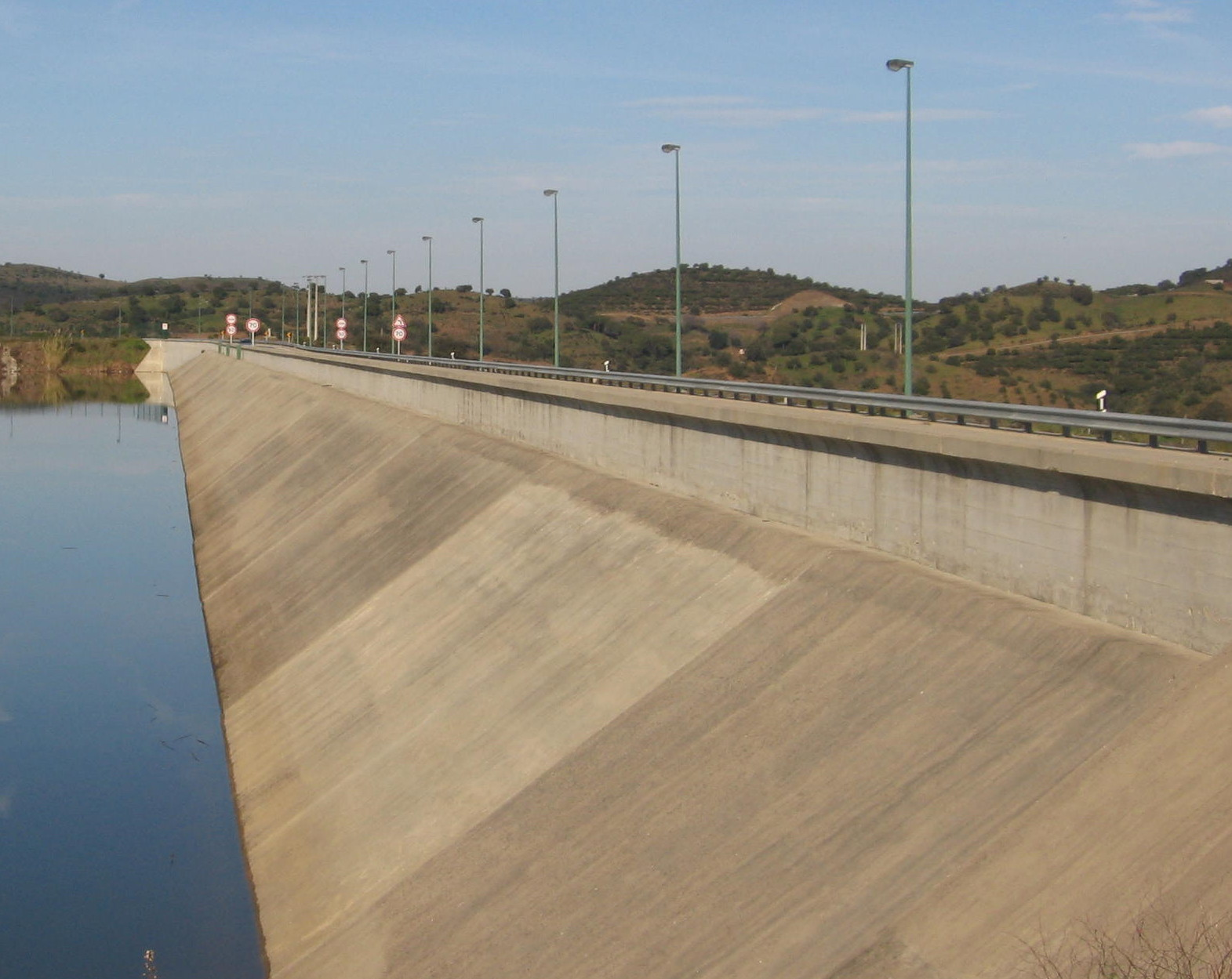
Odeleite dam

The Odeleite Dam (Barragem de Odeleite) was constructed in 1996 on the Odeleite River and serves as a key part of the water supply infrastructure in the Algarve region. It has a crest length of 350 metres (1,150 ft), a height of 65 metres (213 ft), 50 metres (160 ft) of which are above the natural ground level, and a usable capacity of 117,000,000 cubic metres (153,000,000 cu yd) of water. At full storage level of 52 metres (171 ft), the reservoir created by the dam has a total storage capacity of 130 hectometres (14,000 yd) and an inundated surface area of approximately 680.22 hectares (1,680.9 acres).

The Odeleite Dam, along with the Beliche Dam, is part of the Odeleite-Beliche hydraulic system, which supplies water to both the resident population and seasonal visitors in the eastern Algarve (Sotavento Algarvio), serving an estimated 800,000 people. Of this population, 250,000 are permanent residents, while 550,000 are considered seasonal. The system also provides irrigation for 8,600 hectares (21,000 acres) of agricultural land. In cases of water shortages, it can supply water to the western Algarve (Barlavento Algarvio) via a pumping station.

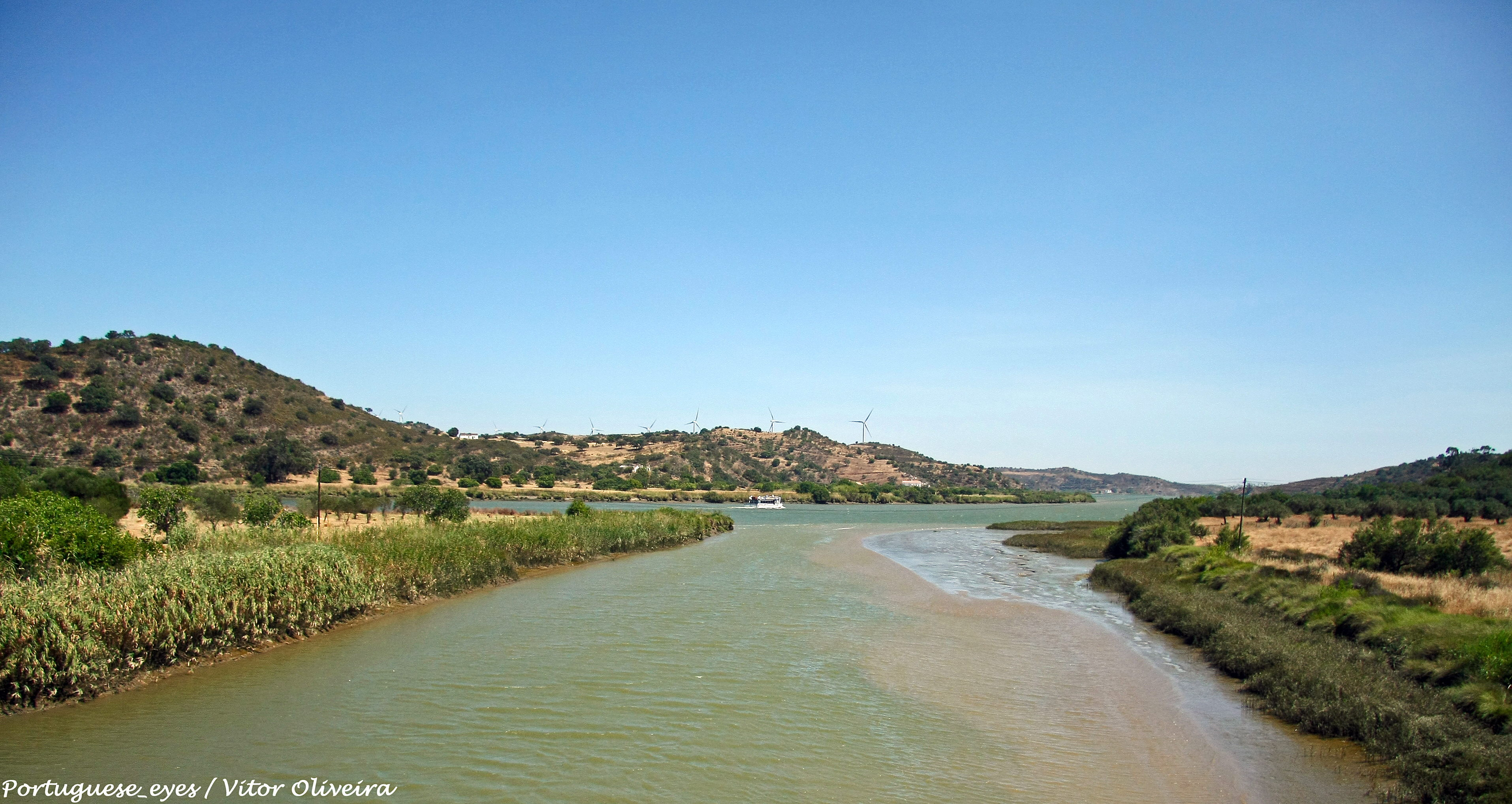
Odeleite river mouth

The reservoir is governed by the Plano de Ordenamento da Albufeira de Odeleite (POAO). This plan defines the management framework to ensure the sustainable use of the territory, safeguarding natural resources, and prioritizing the public water supply. It establishes zoning regulations that distinguish areas dedicated to nature conservation from those suitable for recreational and leisure activities, promoting a balanced coexistence between environmental protection and economic development. The POAO also sets guidelines for controlling urbanization around the reservoir, limiting construction and other human activities that could compromise water quality or ecological integrity. Additionally, the plan considers the potential impacts of climate change, incorporating measures to enhance the reservoir’s resilience to periods of drought and water scarcity. Provisions are included to support sustainable tourism initiatives, encouraging low-impact activities such as hiking and birdwatching while prohibiting practices that could threaten the area's biodiversity.

== River shape and international attention ==
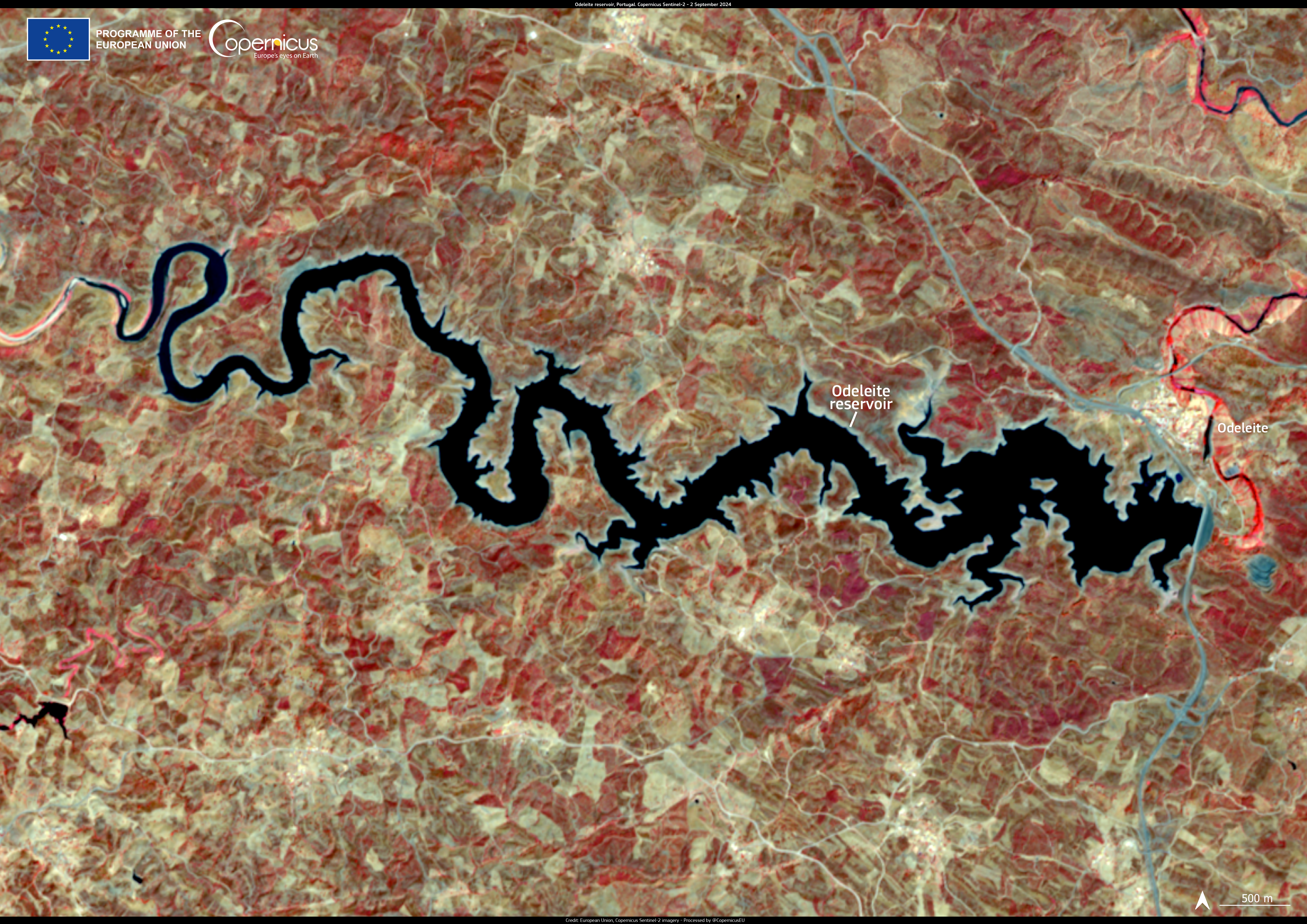
The "Blue Dragon" shape created by the Odeleite dam

Damming the river changed its shape, and the new shape created by the dam has attracted international attention due to its resemblance to a blue dragon. This is a symbol of benevolence, power, wisdom and good luck in Chinese culture, and an emblem that was traditionally used by the emperors throughout history.

The river's international fame began in 2010 when British photographer Steve Richards photographed it while flying over Algarve. The image, showing the river’s sinuous curves mirroring the form of a dragon, was posted on Flickr and quickly went viral. However, its vivid blue hue led many to speculate that the image was artificially enhanced or computer-generated. Richards later explained that the striking colors were a result of processing the original photo using Topaz Adjust 4, with the blue tone reflecting the sky and white flecks caused by clouds.

The river's fame increased in 2015, when a Reddit user posted a similar picture taken on his flight from Amsterdam to Marrakesh. This second picture went viral on the Chinese social media Weibo and was featured on the Chinese network CCTV.
