= O'Kearney =

O'Kearney is a surname. Notable people with the surname include:

- Daniel O'Kearney (died 1778), Irish Catholic bishop
- Dara O'Kearney (born 1965), Irish ultra runner and poker player
- Jacobus Ó Cethernaig (died 1351), anglicised as James O'Kearney, Irish bishop
