= Tomas Ó Mellaig =

Tomas Ó Mellaig, Bishop of Annaghdown, died after 27 May 1250.

Ó Mellaig was a native of what is now County Galway, where his surname is now rendered Melia. He was a kinsman of the first bishop, Conn Ua Mellaig, though their exact relationship is unknown.

He was consecrated about 1242 but it is not clear if he ever physically occupied the see, as he acted as a suffragan bishop in the Diocese of Lincoln in 1246. According to Moody, he may have been deprived of the bishopric on 28 May 1247. He is believed to have died after 27 May 1250.

== See also ==
- Conn Ua Mellaig, Bishop of Annaghdown, died 1202
- Tomás Ó Mellaig, bishop-elect, fl. 1329
- Careena Melia, actress
- Cian Melia, Irish showjumper

Catholic Church titles
Preceded by Murchad Ua Flaithbertaig	Bishop of Annaghdown c.1242–1247/50	Succeeded by Conchobair of Annaghdown
