= Bishop Kearney =

Bishop Kearney may refer to:

== People ==
- James E. Kearney (1884–1977), Roman Catholic Bishop of Salt Lake City and Bishop of Rochester, United States
- John Kearney (bishop) (c.1742–1813), Church of Ireland Bishop of Ossory
- Raymond Augustine Kearney (1902–1956), Roman Catholic Auxiliary Bishop of the Diocese of Brooklyn, United States
- David Kearney (archbishop of Cashel) (died 1624), Irish Roman Catholic prelate

== Places ==
- Bishop Kearney High School (Irondequoit, New York), Roman Catholic secondary school, United States
- Bishop Kearney High School (New York City), Roman Catholic secondary school, United States

== See also ==
- Daniel O'Kearney (died 1778), Roman Catholic Bishop of Limerick, Ireland
