= Sotavento =

Sotavento is a Portuguese and Spanish word meaning "leeward". Places with that name include:

- Sotavento Algarvio, the eastern part of the Algarve region, Portugal, around Faro and Tavira
- Sotavento Islands, the southern group of Cape Verde islands
- Sotavento Region of the Mexican state of Veracruz
