= John Tierney =

John Tierney may refer to:

== Politicians ==
- John Tierney (Australian politician) (born 1946), Liberal member of the Australian Senate
- John Tierney (Irish politician) (born 1951)
- John F. Tierney (born 1951), United States Representative from Massachusetts
- John H. Tierney (1831-1907), American farmer and politician
- John J. Tierney (19??-2005), Boston City Council member

== Sportsmen ==
- John Tierney (footballer), player for Cork City Football Club
- John Tierney (Gaelic footballer) (born 1982), Gaelic footballer
- John Tierney (rower), American rower
- John Tierney (cricketer) (born 1964), English cricketer

== Others ==
- John Tierney (journalist) (born 1953), American journalist
- John Tierney (film editor), known for his editing work on Sesame Street
- John M. Tierney, United States naval aviator and finalist for NASA Astronaut Group 1
