= Fisheries Research Board of Canada =

Defunct Canadian federal agency

Fisheries Research Board of Canada / Office des Recherches Sur les Pêcheries du Canada
Agency overview
- Formed: 1937
- Dissolved: 1979

The Fisheries Research Board of Canada / l' Office des Recherches Sur les Pêcheries du Canada (English acronym: FRB or FRBC) was for about 36 years Canada's principal federal organization for research on aquatic sciences and fisheries. It was officially created in 1937. In 1973 its staff was transferred to Canada's Department of the Environment. The FRB was officially abolished in 1979.

== Predecessor organizations and history ==
In 1893 the Parliament of Canada appointed Edward Ernest Prince the Dominion Commissioner of Fisheries. He advocated a marine scientific station for Canada. In 1898 Parliament funded the establishment of a Board of Management of the Marine Biological Station of Canada with Prince as director and chairman. In addition to Prince as director, the Board of Management consisted of David P. Penhallow as secretary-treasurer and seven trustees. Among the trustees were Robert Ramsay Wright, Archibald Macallum, Victor-Alphonse Huard, and Ernest MacBride. The initial biological station was designed in the shape of an ark to be placed on a scow for movement along the Canadian coastline. The station could be either moored or hauled up onto land. This floatable station moved from place to place depending upon the scientific project. The station was in operation from 1899 until 1907, when it suffered severe damage. In 1908 Parliament funded two permanent biological stations: the St. Andrews Biological Station, St. Andrews, Nova Scotia, and the Pacific Biological Station, Nanaimo, British Columbia. The two permanent stations were staffed in the summers by volunteers from universities.

In 1912 Parliament passed an act which changed the name of the Board of Management of the Marine Biological Station to the Biological Board of Canada. With more government funding in the 1920s, the Biological Board of Canada hired full-time employees and created laboratories to support Canada industry in fishing and related food processing. In 1937 the Biological Board of Canada became the FRB. After WW II, the FRB created more laboratories and expanded its research on oceanography, fish stocks, and eastern Arctic marine biology. In the late 1960s and early 1970s there were government reorganizations that radically changed the status of the FRB and led to its phasing out.

== Journal of the Fisheries Research Board of Canada ==
The Journal of the Fisheries Research Board of Canada (abbr. J Fish Res Board Can) was published in 33 volumes from 1938 to 1979. The journal was preceded by the Journal of the Biological Board of Canada (1934–1937) and succeeded by the Canadian Journal of Fisheries and Aquatic Sciences. The Journal of the Biological Board of Canada was preceded by Contributions to Canadian Biology and Fisheries.

William Edwin Ricker, a leading fisheries scientist, was the journal's editor-in-chief from 1950 until his retirement in 1973. His famous paper 1954 paper Stock and recruitment was published in the journal. Ricker's successor as editor-in-chief was James Cameron Stevenson.
