= São Brás de Alportel =

- Municipality
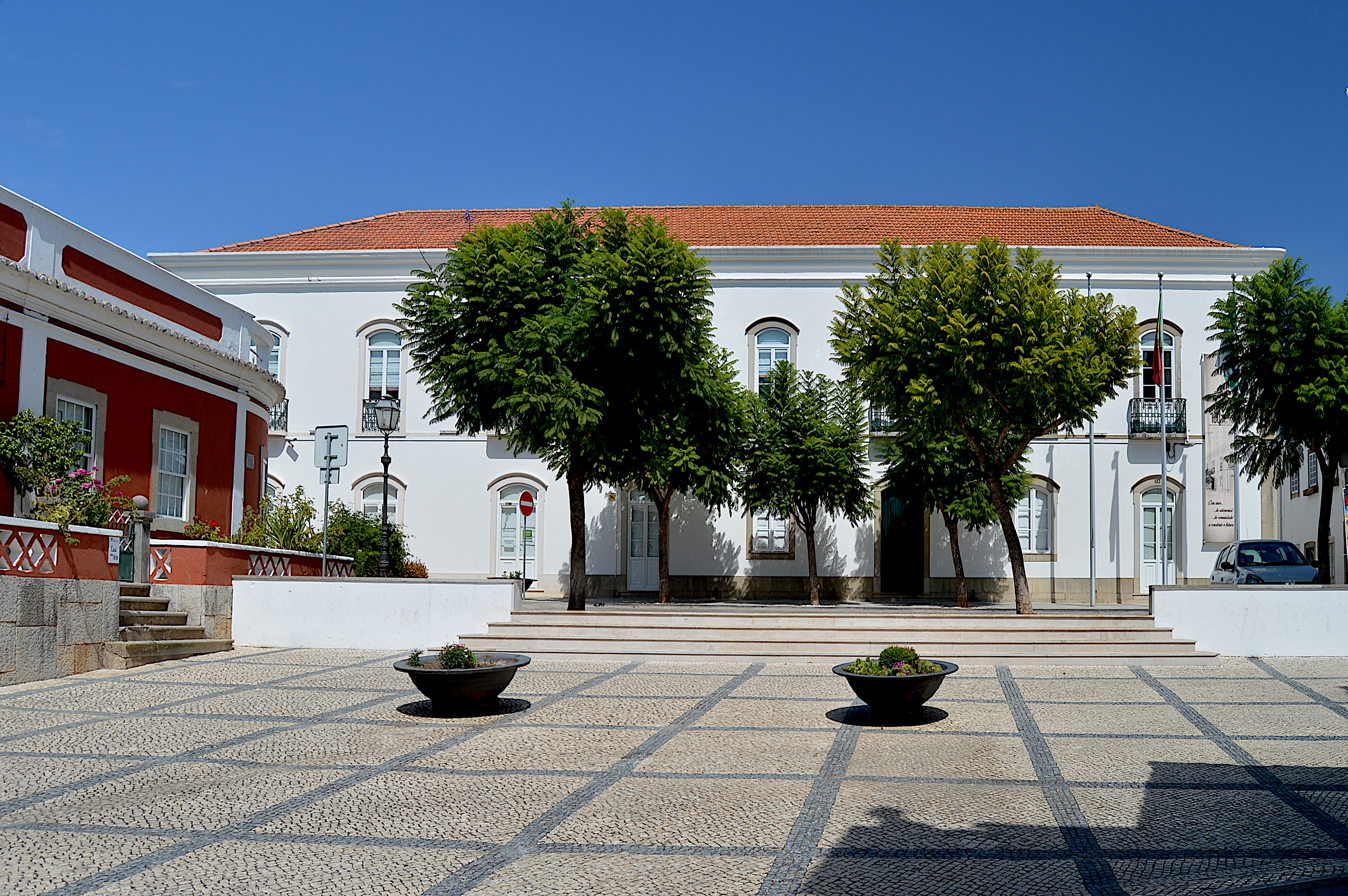
- Town Hall of São Brás de Alportel

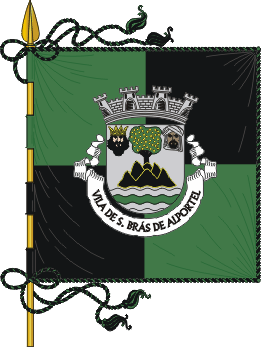
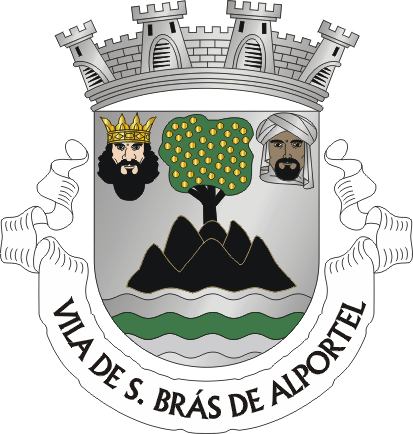
- Flag Coat of arms
- Interactive map of São Brás de Alportel
- Coordinates: 37°09′N 7°53′W
- Country: Portugal
- Region: Algarve
- Intermunic. comm.: Algarve
- District: Faro
- Seat: São Brás de Alportel Municipal Chamber
- Parishes: 1

Government
  - President: Vítor Guerreiro (PS)

Area
  - Total: 153.37 km^{2} (59.22 sq mi)

Population (2011)
  - Total: 10,662
  - Density: 69.518/km^{2} (180.05/sq mi)
- Time zone: UTC+00:00 (WET)
  - Summer (DST): UTC+01:00 (WEST)
- Local holiday: June 1
- Website: www.cm-sbras.pt

São Brás de Alportel (pronounced [sɐ̃w ˈbɾaʒ ð(i) alpuɾˈtɛl]) is a town and municipality in the District of Faro, Algarve region, in Portugal. The population in 2011 was 10,662, in an area of 153.37 km^{2}. The present Mayor is Vítor Guerreiro, elected by the Socialist Party. The municipal holiday is June 1.

São Brás de Alportel is a member of Cittaslow.

== History ==
The human occupation in the municipality of São Brás de Alportel goes back to Prehistory (since the Paleolithic), as attested by several findings, such as flint chips, quartz and quartzite, a black schist burnisher and a pebble in jasper shale that seems to have a bovine drawn on one surface and, on the other, a horse. As far as Protohistory is concerned, there is still a total lack of knowledge. The most represented and, therefore, most studied historical periods are the Roman and the Islamic medieval.

=== Conii and Turdetanian ===
Like the rest of Algarve region, the area was inhabited by the Conii and Turdetanian before the arrival of the Romans.

=== Roman period ===
The Roman presence was witnessed, in this territory, by several vestiges that point us to the existence of possible necropolis, agricultural infrastructure, a Roman villa, a mutatio (station for changing animals and carts for travelers) and the sidewalks that integrated the old Roman road network. These sites have been identified by the presence of fragments of fine pottery (campanian and terra sigillata), common pottery, storage pottery (amphorae and dolia), building pottery (tegulae, imbrices and bricks) and illuminated pottery (lucernas), as well as the discovery of a mason made from a bucket handle (pot handle) and graves with associated spoils whose chronology dates back to the II/I century B.C. and continues until the IV-V A.D. Also noteworthy are the two funerary monuments, in the shape of an ara, one of which (IRPC 64) presents, besides the inscription to Cecilia Marina, a decoration in relief on the four faces, considered unique in the Conventus Pacensis.

=== Visigoths ===
With the Fall of the Roman Empire, the area fell under the rule of the Visigothic Kingdom until the Muslim invasion of Iberia in the 8th century.

=== Islamic period ===
The Islamic occupation is attested by documental sources (XI-XIII centuries) and archaeological sites with a chronological occupation between the Caliphal (X-XI centuries) and Almohad (XII-XIII centuries) periods, namely alcarias and small agricultural settlements, some located near paved roads. These sites were identified by the presence of ceramic artifacts: tableware (decorated with "cuerda seca" and honey glazed with manganese decoration), kitchenware (pots and bowls), storage (pitchers, jugs) and construction (typed tiles); and also by metallic artefacts: such as two amulets (prophylactic objects) containing religious inscriptions (11th-12th and 12th-13th centuries), and a set of coins that includes a dinar (gold coin).

=== Middle Ages ===
From Roman times (2nd/1st century BC) until the foundation of the municipality in 1914 (20th century) São Brás de Alportel belonged to the term of the city of Faro (formerly known as Ossonoba), which is why its history maintains, throughout all these centuries, a close relationship with that city. However, little is known of the history of the current municipality of São Brás de Alportel in the period between 1249/50 (2nd half of the 13th century - last conquest of the Algarve) and 1517 (beginning of the 16th century - Visitation of the Order of Santiago).

=== Renaissance ===
In the 15th century São Brás de Alportel would have been a place with a simple hermitage. This small temple was located next to the old Roman road - the current-day Calçadinha - which connected the town to the northern lands of Faro, to the south. In the middle of the 16th century, as happened in several other Algarvean localities, São Brás de Alportel was elevated to the seat of a parish and, consequently, a new and larger temple was rebuilt.

=== Age of Enlightenment ===
Between the 17th and 18th centuries, following the transfer of the bishopric seat from Silves to Faro (1581), the then Bishop of the Algarve had the Episcopal Palace built in São Brás de Alportel which by then belonged to the concelho of Faro.

=== Industrialization ===
During the 19th century the parish became an important economic center. Cork oak plantations encouraged commercial development and made São Brás de Alportel the largest cork producing center in Portugal. At the beginning of the 20th century (1912), São Brás de Alportel was the most populated parish in the Faro municipality, with about 12,500 inhabitants. The economic and population expansion of the parish was a decisive factor for its elevation to municipality. The movement in defense of the autonomy of São Brás de Alportel emerged in the beginning of the 20th century, motivated by the economic growth of the village. It is the Republican Parish Commission that takes on the organization of the movement, which gains strength from 1910 onwards, as the political conditions are more favorable and the old supporters of republican propaganda, acquittances of João Rosa Beatriz, are in the government. Many barriers were raised to the pretensions of the republicans of São Brás. João Rosa Beatriz went to Lisbon several times, requesting the support of several personalities that proved to be decisive for the realization of that desire. In December 1912, its revolutionary leader Machado Santos presented, in the Portuguese Parliament, the bill granting administrative autonomy to the then most populous parish in the municipality of Faro. Through the efforts and diligence of João Rosa Beatriz, the bill was approved and published in the Diário do Governo, on June 1, 1914, elevating the parish of São Brás to a municipality, with the denomination of Alportel and with its headquarters in the village of São Brás. In the course of events, a provisional Administrative Commission was created, presided by Virgílio de Passos. To install the new Municipality, and after heated struggles, on September 5, was authorized the cession of the Episcopal Palace and respective fence and parish residence to the Alportel Town Council, to operate the official primary schools and public schools and the public, municipal and State offices. On October 14 of that year, João Rosa Beatriz was appointed by the Civil Governor of Faro, as interim administrator of the municipality (a position equivalent to the one we know today as Mayor), establishing as priorities public education, security and maintenance of public order, as well as accessibility to the town of São Brás de Alportel. On November 8, the first Municipal Commission of São Brás de Alportel was elected, with José Pereira da Machada as President of the Senate. A short time later, a sudden political change altered the course of events. The democratic government had appointed a new Civil Governor for the district of Faro, who in turn removed João Rosa Beatriz from his post, replacing him with José Baptista Dias Gomes. Once removed from his post, João Rosa Beatriz did not stop professing his ideals and his love for the land where he was born, fighting for several benefits for his town: the installation of a mobile library in the town, the creation of a municipal notary's office, the placement of a rural letter carrier in the municipality and the installation of the railway linking Loulé to São Brás. In April 1916, during a violent riot, the battalion of volunteers that he headed at the time also played a fundamental role in re-establishing public order in São Brás. At the time the world was watching the destruction caused by the First World War. Many young men recruited by the army left São Brás de Alportel, while others sought new directions for their businesses and their lives.

== Climate ==
São Brás de Alportel has a hot-summer Mediterranean climate with hot, dry summers and mild, wet winters. Its location on the Algarvian Barrocal, an inland, higher altitude karstic region, makes its winters slightly cooler and summers hotter than those experienced near the coast. Precipitation is also higher, with December being the wettest month.

Climate data for São Brás de Alportel (Portela), altitude: 334 m (1,096 ft), extremes 1980-2001
Month	Jan	Feb	Mar	Apr	May	Jun	Jul	Aug	Sep	Oct	Nov	Dec	Year
Record high °C (°F)	22.0 (71.6)	22.0 (71.6)	27.0 (80.6)	27.0 (80.6)	32.0 (89.6)	36.0 (96.8)	41.0 (105.8)	40.0 (104.0)	38.9 (102.0)	31.0 (87.8)	26.0 (78.8)	20.5 (68.9)	41.0 (105.8)
Mean daily maximum °C (°F)	14.5 (58.1)	15.6 (60.1)	17.7 (63.9)	18.7 (65.7)	22.6 (72.7)	28.0 (82.4)	31.7 (89.1)	31.3 (88.3)	27.8 (82.0)	22.8 (73.0)	18.1 (64.6)	15.4 (59.7)	22.0 (71.6)
Daily mean °C (°F)	10.4 (50.7)	11.1 (52.0)	13.3 (55.9)	14.5 (58.1)	17.6 (63.7)	21.5 (70.7)	24.7 (76.5)	24.8 (76.6)	21.8 (71.2)	17.8 (64.0)	13.8 (56.8)	11.4 (52.5)	16.9 (62.4)
Mean daily minimum °C (°F)	6.3 (43.3)	6.6 (43.9)	8.9 (48.0)	10.3 (50.5)	12.6 (54.7)	15.0 (59.0)	17.7 (63.9)	18.3 (64.9)	15.8 (60.4)	12.8 (55.0)	9.5 (49.1)	7.4 (45.3)	11.8 (53.2)
Record low °C (°F)	0.3 (32.5)	0.1 (32.2)	−4.5 (23.9)	3.0 (37.4)	4.0 (39.2)	7.4 (45.3)	10.2 (50.4)	11.0 (51.8)	7.5 (45.5)	4.5 (40.1)	1.0 (33.8)	0.8 (33.4)	−4.5 (23.9)
Average precipitation mm (inches)	91.3 (3.59)	71.4 (2.81)	57.8 (2.28)	64.6 (2.54)	40.5 (1.59)	10.2 (0.40)	3.6 (0.14)	4.3 (0.17)	30.8 (1.21)	88.2 (3.47)	107.4 (4.23)	162.4 (6.39)	732.5 (28.82)
Average relative humidity (%)	78	77	74	67	62	53	47	52	66	74	76	80	67
Source: Portuguese Environment Agency

== Economy ==
The municipality's economic activities are almost exclusively concentrated in the tertiary sector and, within this, mostly in retail trade, structured in small stores. The town has Intermarché, Lidl and Pingo Doce supermarkets. The secondary sector once played an important role, mainly through the cork industry, the stone extraction and transformation industry, and construction. However, either due to competition from large economic groups in the first, or the almost total closure of the second, or the crisis in the third, those industries suffered a sharp decline. São Brás de Alportel's cork has been used as a material for the production of several items by companies that make products ranging from cork stoppers to fashionware, and Pelcor, headquartered in São Brás de Alportel, is the first luxury brand of fashion and lifestyle accessories in cork skin combining design, innovation and sustainability. Agriculture and forestry, besides carob and cork, have no expression, living practically on the charity and resistance of the elders and their traditional agrarian way of life, and the tertiary-superior, or quaternary, sector does not even mark presence. However, expats from Central and Northern Europe, in particular pensioners, settle in the municipality in considerably large numbers due to the peaceful nature of the local people and their way of life, sunny weather, the strategic location of São Brás de Alportel in the middle of Algarve and the proximity of the reputed Algarvean beaches along the coast of both the Sotavento Algarvio and the Barlavento Algarvio. The town is also a satellite town to both Faro city and the city of Loulé.

== Parishes ==
Administratively, the municipality consists of 1 civil parish (freguesia):

- São Brás de Alportel
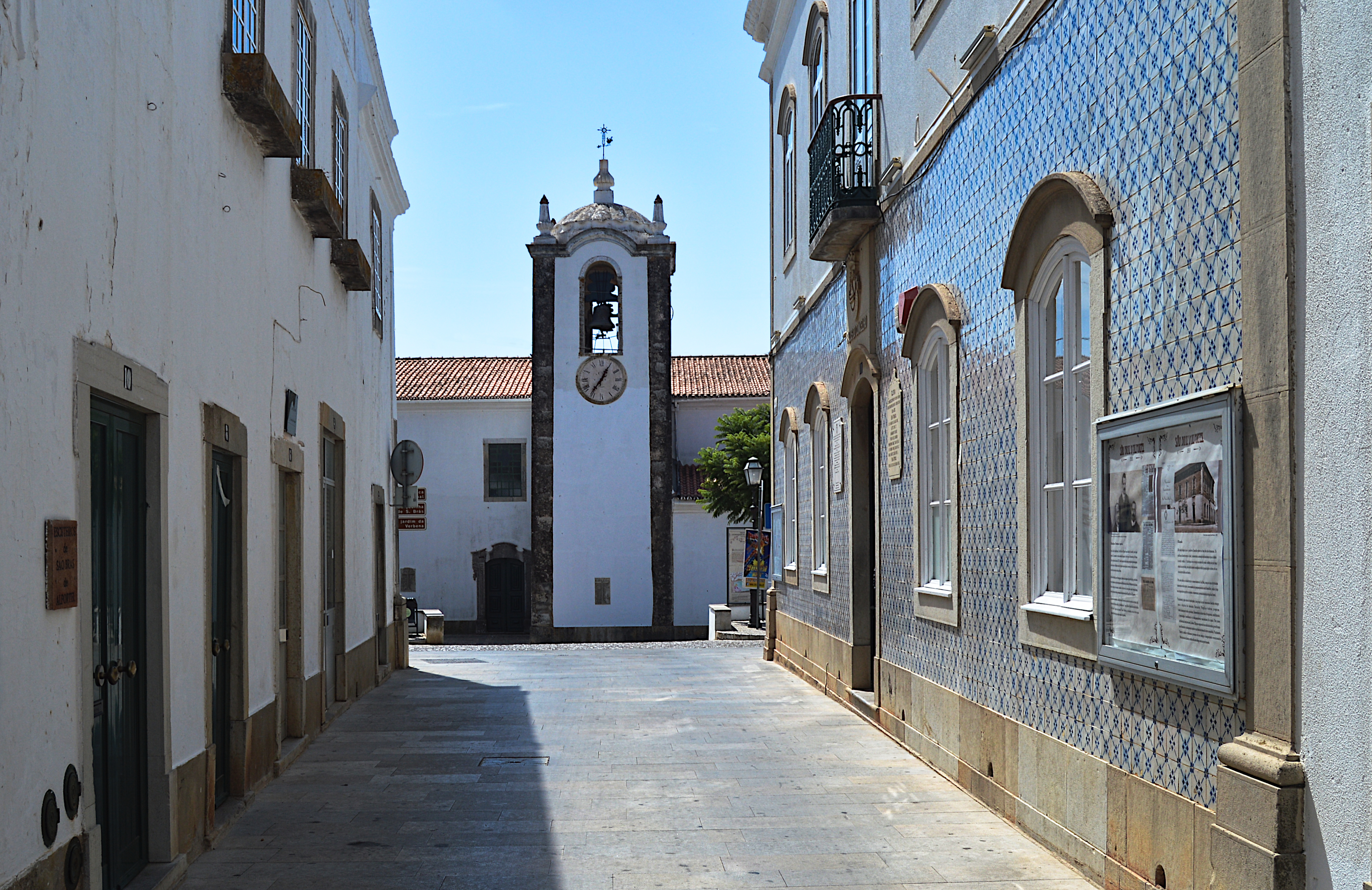

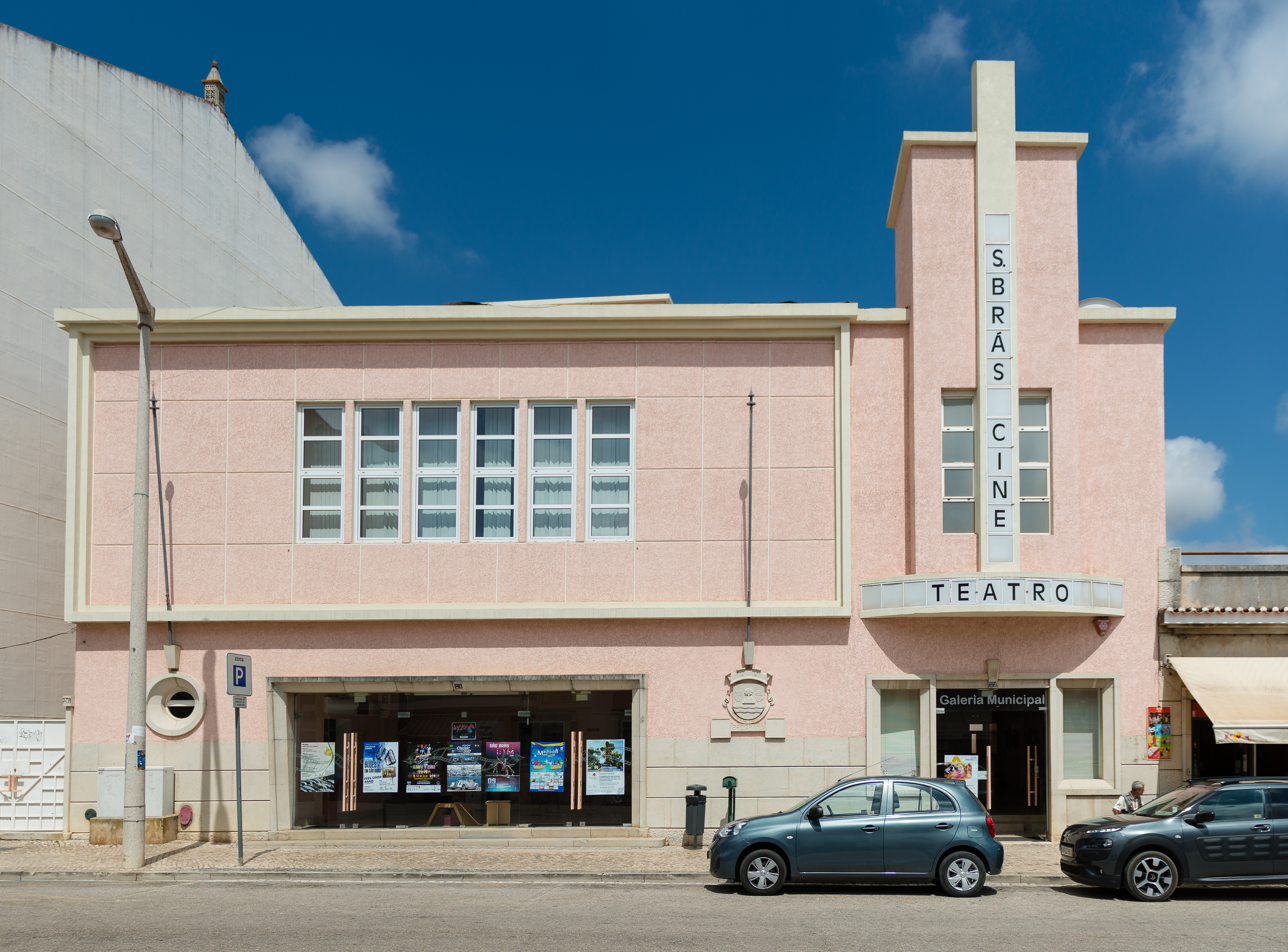

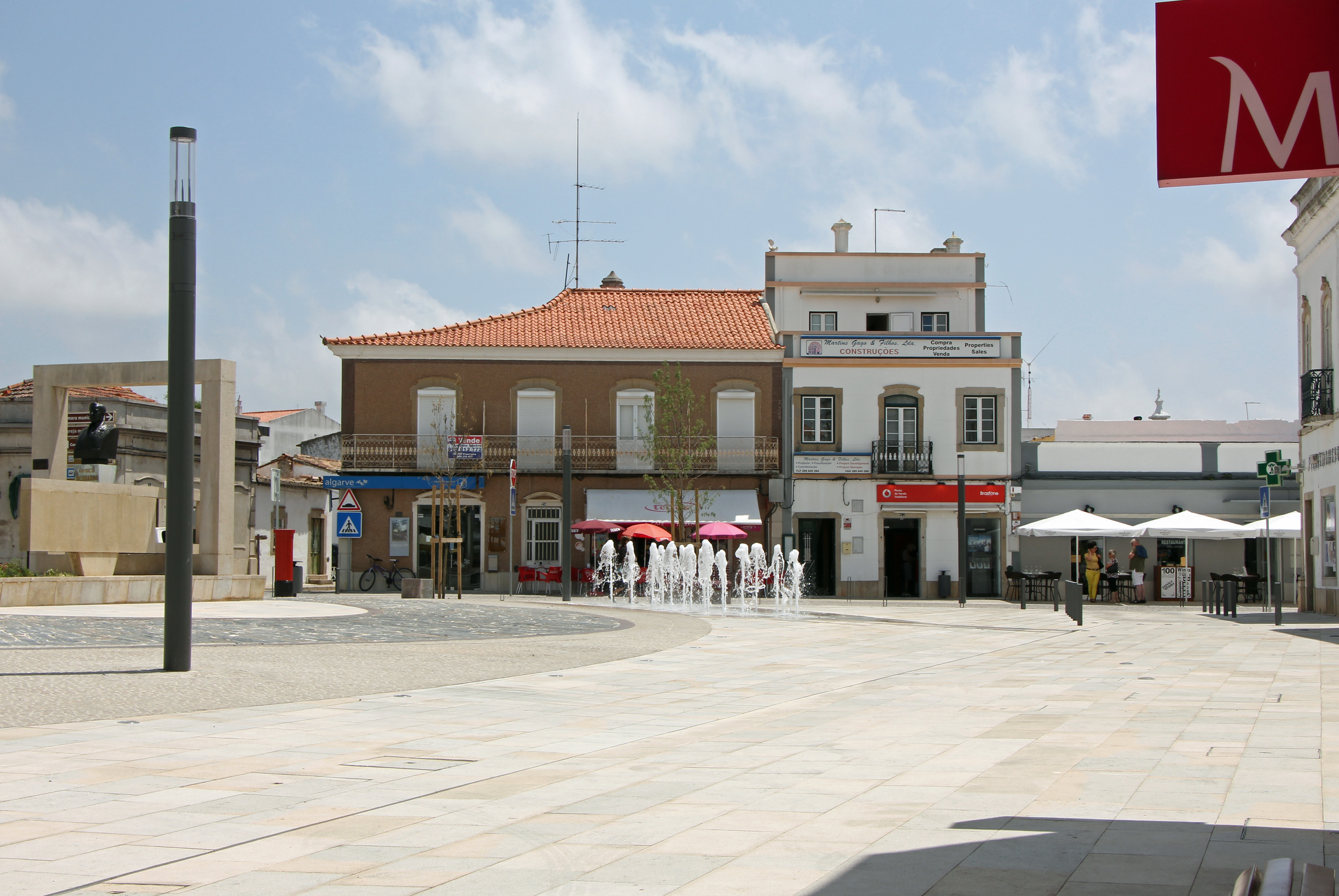

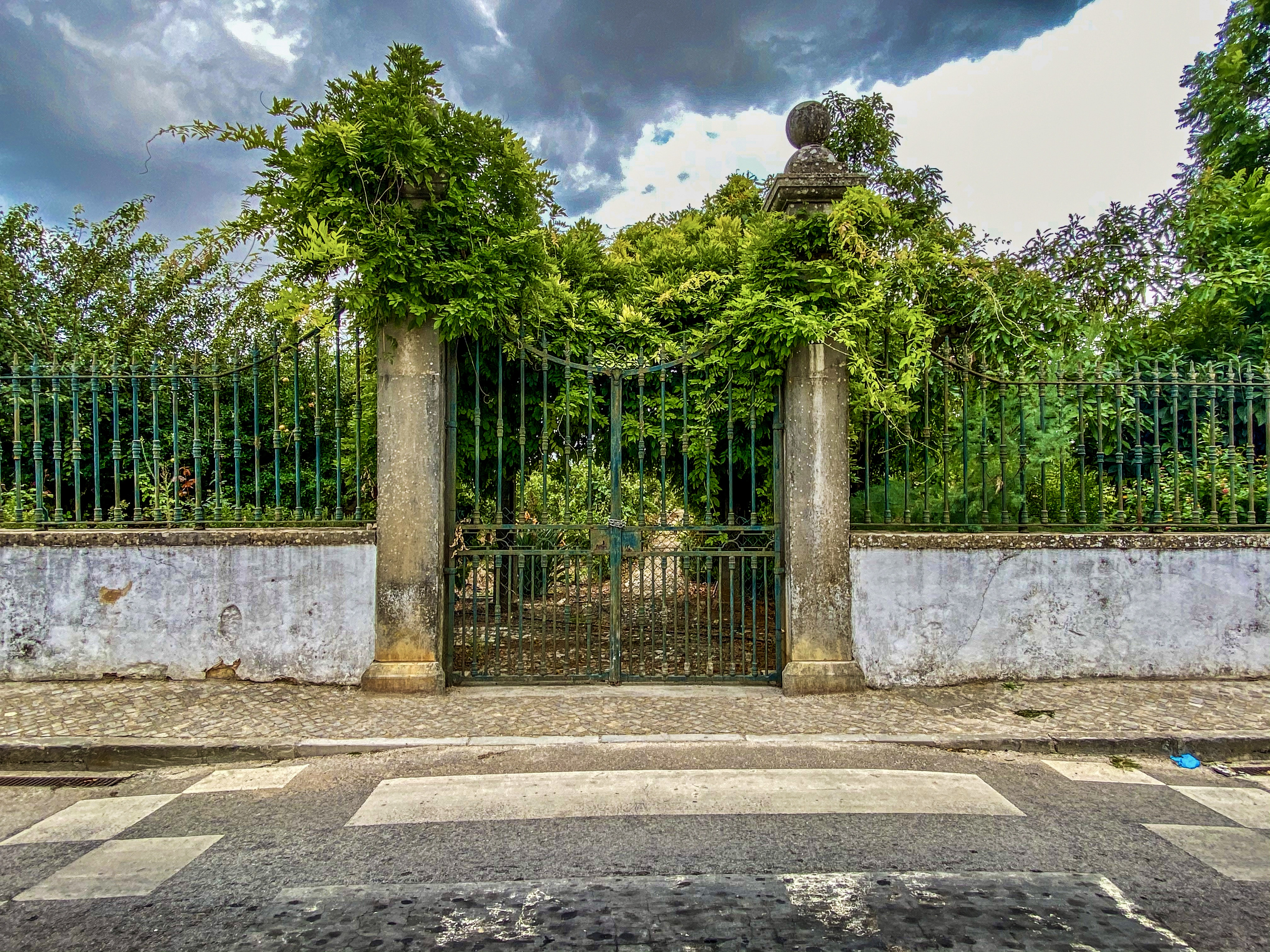
