= Flann Ó Tighearnaigh =

Flann Ó Tighearnaigh (IPA:[ˈfˠl̪ˠaːn̪ˠoːˈtʲɪjəɾˠn̪ˠiː]), was a Gaelic-Irish Lord who died 1273.

== Overview ==
They Ó Tighearnaigh family of Carra, County Mayo (in what is now County Mayo) were said to be a branch of the Uí Fiachrach Muaidhe of north Connacht. However, they may have originally being of the Partraige people, and merely allied themselves to the Uí Fiachrach Muaidhe dynasty. The surname is now rendered Tierney. Bearers of the name are found in both County Mayo and County Galway.

== Flann, Lord of Carra ==
"Aedh mac Felim Ó Conchobair, Kings of Connacht from 1256 to 1274, supported the Ó Muireadhaigh family in their bid to become lords of Carra, which was held by members of the Ó Tighearnaigh family. In an effort to resolve the dispute, "a meeting was called to negotiate the position. However, with the aid of Hugh O'Connor, the son of Felim O'Connors King of Connaught, the O'Murrays contrived to murder all the Tierney clan present. Some survived but their power diminished."

== Annalistic extract ==
Sub anno 1273, the Annals of the Four Masters record that:

Flann Ó Tighernaigh tigherna Cera do marbhadh d'Ó Muiréadhaigh im thighernus Cera tria neart Aodha mic Fedhlimidh Uí Choncobhair./Flann O'Tierney, Lord of Carra, was slain by the O'Murrays in a dispute concerning the lordship of Carra, and through the power of Hugh, son of Felim O'Conor.
