= Amy Norris =

American politician

Member-elect of the New Hampshire House of Representatives from the Coos 1st district
- Assuming office December 2026
- Succeeding: James W. Tierney Jr.

Personal details
- Party: Republican

Amy Norris is an American politician. A member of the Republican Party, she is the member-elect for the Coos 1st district of the New Hampshire House of Representatives.
