= Tigernach =

Tigernach, an early Irish personal name, may refer to:

- Tigernach of Clones (d. 549), patron saint of Clones
- Tigernach mac Fócartai (d. 865), king of Lagore (south Brega)
- Tigernach Ua Braín (d. 1088), abbot of Clonmacnoise and Roscommon, putative author of the Annals of Tigernach
- Tigernach Ua Máel Eóin (d. 1172), abbot of Clonmacnoise

== See also ==
- Annals of Tigernach
