= Canadian Journal of Fisheries and Aquatic Sciences =

- Cover of the January 2021 issue of Canadian Journal of Fisheries and Aquatic Sciences
- Discipline: Aquatic sciences
- Language: English
- Edited by: Yong Chen; Keith Tierney

Publication details
- Former names: Contributions to Canadian Biology and Fisheries; Journal of the Biological Board of Canada; Journal of the Fisheries Research Board of Canada
- Publisher: Canadian Science Publishing (Canada)
- Frequency: Monthly
- Impact factor: 2.595 (2020)

Standard abbreviations
- ISO 4: Can. J. Fish. Aquat. Sci.

Indexing
- ISSN: 0706-652X (print); 1205-7533 (web)
- LCCN: 80646991

Links
- Journal homepage

The Canadian Journal of Fisheries and Aquatic Sciences is a peer-reviewed academic journal which focuses on multidisciplinary field of aquatic sciences. It was founded in 1901 by the Biological Board of Canada, later known as the Fisheries Research Board of Canada.

It is published by Canadian Science Publishing.

== Publishing history ==
- founded 1901, as Contributions to Canadian Biology and Fisheries
- name changed to Journal of the Biological Board of Canada
- name changed to Journal of the Fisheries Research Board of Canada
- name changed to Canadian Journal of Fisheries and Aquatic Sciences

== Abstracting and indexing ==
The journal is indexed in Science Citation Index Expanded, Scopus, Academic Search Premier, PASCAL, Animal Behavior Abstracts, Aqualine, Aquatic Science & Fisheries Abstracts (ASFA), Arctic & Antarctic Regions, BIOSIS, CAB Abstracts, Environment Index, Pollution Abstracts, Veterinary Science Database, Geobase.
