= Murchad Ua Flaithbertaig =

Irish bishop (died 1241)

Murchad Ua Flaithbertaig was Bishop of Annaghdown c. 1202-1241.

Ua Flaithbertaig was a member of that branch of the Muintir Murchada who took the surname Ó Flaithbheartaigh. His family were originally native to the Diocese of Annaghdown before been expelled by the Kings of Connacht and the de Burgh Earls of Ulster. Nothing particular appears to be known of Murchad's term, though he is credited with the construct (or restoration) of a round tower at Annaghdown in 1238, the last ever to be raised in Ireland.

== See also ==
- Ó Flaithbertaigh

== Sources ==
- A New History of Ireland: Volume IX - Maps, Genealogies, Lists, ed. T.W. Moody, F.X. Martin, F.J. Byrne, pp. 322–324.

Catholic Church titles
| Preceded by Conn Ua Mellaig | Bishop of Annaghdown c.1202–1241 | Succeeded by Tomas Ó Mellaig |
