= São Brás de Alportel Municipal Chamber =

Legislative body of São Brás de Alportel

Coordinates: 37.15065°N 7.88852°W

São Brás de Alportel Municipal Chamber Câmara Municipal de São Brás de Alportel
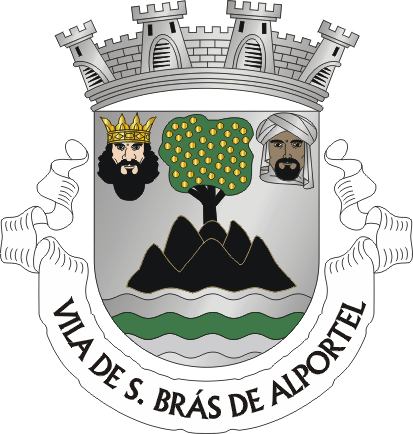
- Coat of arms of the town of São Brás de Alportel

Type
- Type: Câmara municipal
- Term limits: 3

History
- Founded: 1 June 1914; 111 years ago

Leadership
- President: Vitor Manuel Martins Guerreiro, PS since 20 October 2021
- Vice President: Marlene de Sousa Guerreiro, PS since 20 October 2021

Structure
- Seats: 5
- Political groups: Municipal Executive (3) PS (3) Opposition (2) PSD (2)
- Length of term: Four years

Elections
- Last election: 26 September 2021
- Next election: Sometime between 22 September and 14 October 2025

Meeting place
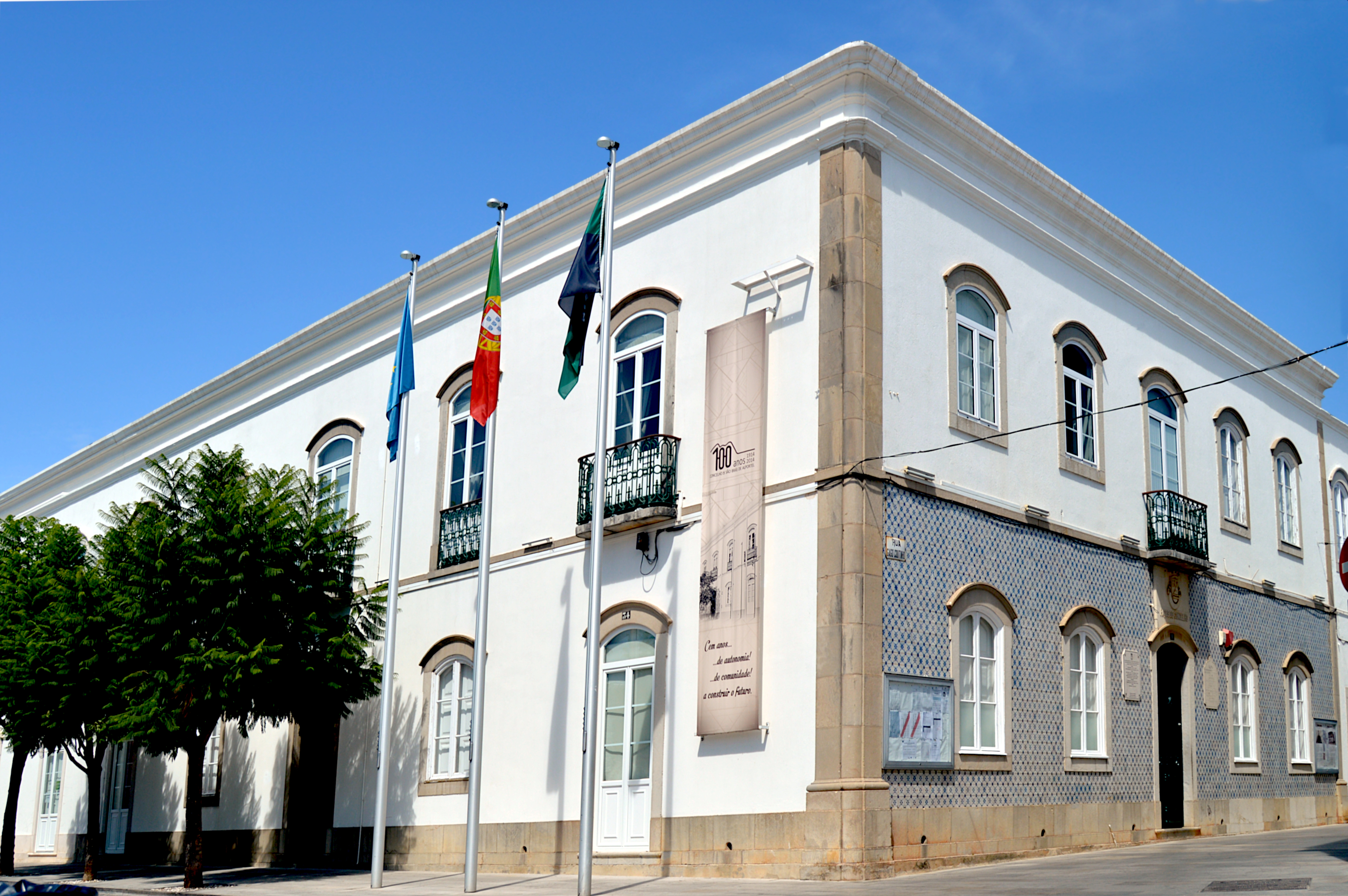
- Paços do Concelho de São Brás de Alportel

Website
- www.cm-sbras.pt/pt/Default.aspx

The São Brás de Alportel Municipal Chamber (Portuguese: Câmara Municipal de São Brás de Alportel) is the administrative authority in the municipality of São Brás de Alportel. It has 1 freguesia in its area of jurisdiction and is based in the town of São Brás de Alportel, on the Faro District. This freguesia is São Brás de Alportel.

The São Brás de Alportel City Council is made up of 5 councillors, representing, currently, two different political forces. The first candidate on the list with the most votes in a municipal election or, in the event of a vacancy, the next candidate on the list, takes office as President of the Municipal Chamber.

== List of the Presidents of the Municipal Chamber of São Brás de Alportel ==
- João Pires Cruz – (1976–1982)
- António Pires Bica – (1982–1989)
- José de Sousa Pires – (1989–2001)
- António Jacinto Eusébio – (2001–2013)
- Vitor Manuel Martins Guerreiro – (2013–2025)

(The list is incomplete)
