= Tigerna =

A tiarna (Irish), tighearna from the Old Irish tigerna, is a lord in the Gaelic world and languages. An Ard Tiarna is a "high lord", approximately equal in rank to a count or earl, although many of such higher rank still happen to prefer the title on its own.

Tierney is an anglicised version of the Irish surname Mac Tighearnáin or O'Tighearnaigh, derived from the word.

In later Gaelic sources, for example the Annals of the Four Masters, the term has also been frequently used to replace the title Rí (king) in cases where the authors or current tradition no longer regarded earlier regional and local dynasts as proper kings, even when they are styled such in contemporary sources. Thus when encountered the term is not always to be trusted. In fact this was part of a wider change in the understanding of kingship in the later Middle Ages, and even a living or recently deceased rí might find himself downgraded in certain sources.

== Examples ==
- James Tuchet, 3rd Earl of Castlehaven, Irish nobleman of English family, called Tiarna Beag or "Little Lord" because of his small height
