= Blue Dragon Awards =

Blue Dragon Awards may refer to:

- Blue Dragon Film Awards, annual awards ceremony for excellence in film in South Korea
- Blue Dragon Series Awards, annual awards ceremony for excellence in streaming television in South Korea

== See also ==
- Blue Dragon (disambiguation)
