= John O'More =

John O'More (also known as John O'Moore) was the sole Church of Ireland Bishop of Annaghdown.

He was imprisoned on the grounds that he had accepted the bishopric from The Pope, although there was no record of a papal provision. He was released in 1540 and recognized by The Crown. He died after 1553.
