= Robert J. Tierney =

British professor emeritus of linguistics and literature

Robert J. Tierney is the Dean Emeritus of Education, University of British Columbia and professor emeritus of Language and Literacy Education. He previously held the position of Dean of Education and Social Work and is currently Honorary Professorship at University of Sydney. He is also a published author of articles and books. His research focuses on cognitive processes, reading comprehension, reading-writing relationships, assessment, digital literacy, and global developments in education.

Tierney received the W. S. Gray Award for contributions to literacy education.

== Early life and education ==
Tierney began his career as a classroom teacher in Australia before pursuing higher education opportunities internationally. He holds a Teaching Diploma from William Balmain Teacher's College in Sydney, Australia. He pursued a Bachelor of Arts from the University of Sydney and Macquarie University, and a Bachelor of Science in Education from Jacksonville State University. He furthered his studies at the University of Georgia, earning both a Master's and a Doctorate. Alongside formal education, he participated in postgraduate workshops on research methods, sociology, and psycholinguistics.

== Career ==
Tierney is a Past President of the National Reading Conference, past Chair of the Research Assembly for the National Council for Teachers of English, Past President of the International Literacy Association and past editor of the Reading Research Quarterly.

In Canada, he was President of the Canadian Association of Deans of Education (ACDE) to which he was elected in 2001. In 2010, he was honored with lifetime membership.

Under his leadership, several national accords were formulated by (ACDE) and ratified unanimously including a General Accord, an Accord on Teacher Education, an Accord on Research, recently an Accord on Indigenous Education and one on International Education.

Tierney has been involved with Universitas 21, Asia Pacific Research Universities, with UNESCO and the International Reading Association in Africa, the World Bank in Indonesia, in New Zealand with Maori education leaders and in China with several of China’a Faculties of Educations.

He was invited by Elsevier publishers to form a team of lead editors to guide the fourth edition of the International Encyclopedia of Education.

In 2000, Tierney was appointed Dean at University of British Columbia (2000–2010) followed by a term as Dean of the Faculty of Education and Social Work at the University of Sydney (2010–2013) . He is currently serving as an emeritus Dean and Professor at the University of British Columbia, an honorary Professor at the University of Sydney and as a Distinguished Professor at Beijing Normal University.

== Research and contributions ==
Tierney's research interests lie at the intersection of language, culture, meaning-making, and societal progress. Much of his work focuses on literacy, which has been a central area of educational research, theory, and practice for the past five decades. His studies have contributed to reading comprehension, effective teaching methods, the integration of reading and writing, and the conceptualization of literacy in diverse forms, including multimodal meaning-making. Additionally, Tierney's research addresses global diversity issues, particularly concerning the epistemologies of marginalized groups such as Indigenous peoples, Southern communities, Asian populations, and minority groups in Western societies. His recent endeavors in global meaning-making provide a road map for research and development in literacy across borders.

Tierney's approach shifted the focus from a hierarchical, text-dominated perspective to one that emphasizes reader-centered and constructive comprehension, accommodating students with diverse abilities, including those with special needs. This transition marked a pivotal moment in educational theory and practice, transitioning from a narrow focus on reading to a broader conception of literacies encompassing various modes of meaning-making.

Tierney's concept of Reading as a Composing Process is widely cited and acclaimed. His empirical research on the relationship between writing and critical thinking further catalyzed transformative shifts in how reading was perceived, studied, and taught.

What are most noteworthy were the changes in thinking and practice that were spurred. As suggested, this work was the precursor to literacy (vs. reading) as an overarching construct and the integration of reading and writing in schools as the momentum of these ideas increased and dovetailed with a massive of number of studies of early reading and writing development as well as reading and writing across the disciplines and later meaning making within digital realms.

Tierney became involved in digital literacy during the early stages of digital integration in education, notably through collaboration with Apple Computer. His research, featured in Apple's reports, books, and online journals, explored the impact of hypertext on learning, emphasizing the role of multimedia in constructing meaning and generating new knowledge. Tierney's ongoing involvement with Apple also included funding for longitudinal studies on computer adoption and investigations into the changes teachers undergo when incorporating technology in their classrooms.

== Awards and recognition ==
- WS Gray Citation of Merit, International Reading Association
- Inductee, Reading Hall of Fame
- Distinguished Scholar, Edith Cowan University, Perth Western Australia
- International Research Contributions, Beijing Normal University
- Life membership, Association of Canadian Deans of Education.
- Contributions to public education in British Columbia, British Columbia Deans of Education.
- Literacy Award for outstanding contributions to the Literacy of Ohio Students, Literacy Educator and Advocacy Forum
- Excellence in Teacher-Researcher Collaborations, American Association of College Teacher Educators
- Teacher Excellence Award, University of Illinois
- International Global Educational Research Award, Beijing Normal University.

== Selected publications ==
- International Encyclopedia of Education. Elsevier Science. 15 October 2022. ISBN 978-0-12-818630-5.
- Tierney, R.J. & Pearson, P. D. (2024) Fact-checking the Science of Reading. Literacy Research Commons.
- Tierney, R. J. & Pearson, P. D. (2021) A history of literacy education: waves of research and practice. New York: Teachers College Press.
- Tierney, Robert J. (1 June 2022). "Reading the literacy world: Navigating one's way across the waves of change". Education Review. 29. doi:10.14507/er.v29.3615.
- Tierney, Robert J. (December 2018). "Toward a Model of Global Meaning Making". Journal of Literacy Research. 50 (4): 397–422. doi:10.1177/1086296X18803134.
- Tierney, Robert J. (June 2018). "Global Educational Research in Western Times: The Rise and Plight of Chinese Educational Research". Frontiers of Education in China. 13 (2): 163–192. doi:10.1007/s11516-018-0010-4.
- Tierney, Robert J.; Smith, Graham Hingangaroa; Kan, Wei (September 2021). "Global Literacies Research Diversity: A Manifesto for Change". Journal of Literacy Research. 53 (3): 294–312. doi:10.1177/1086296X211031262.
- Tierney, Robert J.; Kan, Wei (December 2016). "Knowledge Globalization Within and Across the People's Republic of China and the United States: A Cross-National Study of Internationalization of Educational Research in the Early 21st Century". American Educational Research Journal. 53 (6): 1759–1791. doi:10.3102/0002831216678320.
- Tierney, Robert J. (2016). Toward a theory of literacy meaning making within virtual worlds. Guildford Press.
