= Keith Tierney =

Canadian ichthyologist and professor studying fish and water quality

Keith B. Tierney
- Education: Simon Fraser University; University of British Columbia
- Occupations: ichthyologist and professor
- Employer: University of Alberta

Keith B. Tierney is a Canadian fish scientist and academic. He is a full professor at the University of Alberta as well as editor of the Canadian Journal of Fisheries and Aquatic Sciences. He is interested in how water quality interacts aquatic vertebrates.

== Education ==
- PhD, Simon Fraser University, 1 January 2004 - 31 August 2007
- Master of Business Administration, University of British Columbia, September 2001 - May 2002
- Master of Science, Simon Fraser University, January 1998 - May 2001
- Bachelor of Science, Simon Fraser University, September 1991 - May 1996

== Publications ==
Towards a comprehensive catalog of zebrafish behavior 1.0 and beyond
