= Frank Aloysius Tierney =

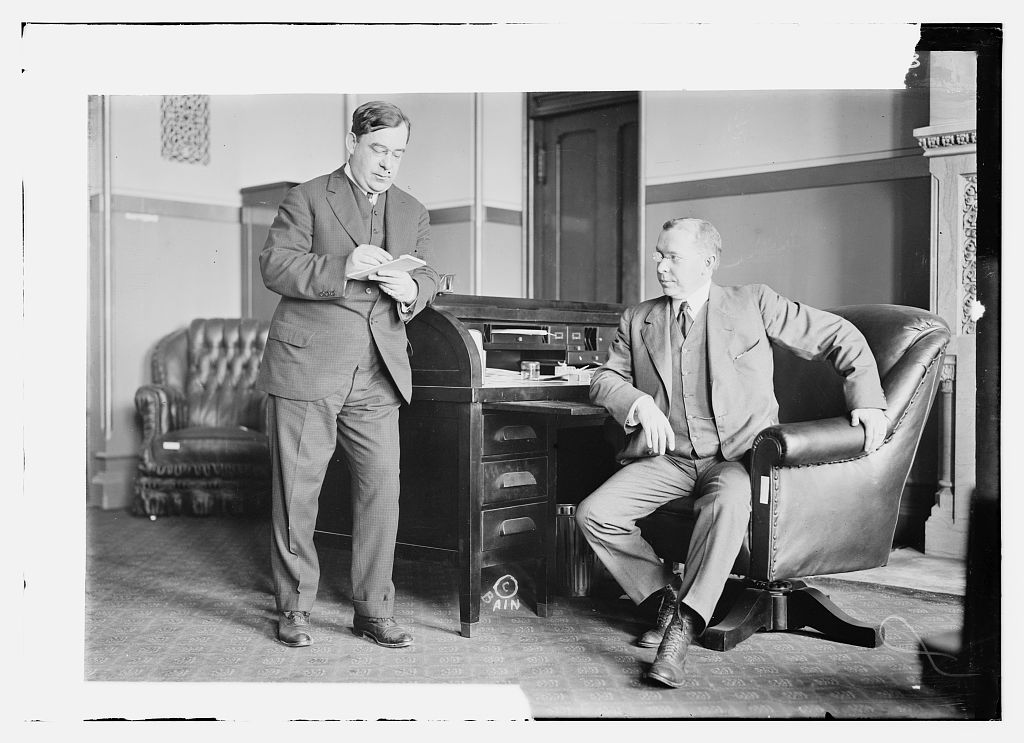
Tierney and Martin Henry Glynn in 1913

Frank Aloysius Tierney (April 13, 1879 - September 17, 1923) was a tenor singer, the secretary to Governor Martin Henry Glynn, and later the Deputy Commissioner for Workmen's Compensation in Albany, New York.

== Biography ==
He died on September 17, 1923. His widow died in 1943.
