= Stuffed Puffs =

American confectionery company

Stuffed Puffs LLC
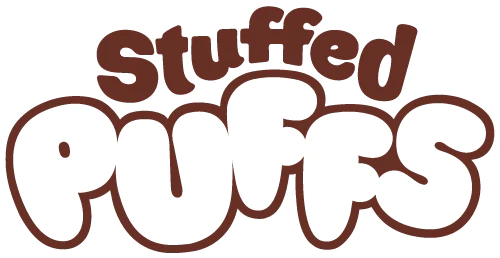
- Company type: Private company
- Industry: Confectionery
- Founded: 2012 (12 yrs ago)
- Founder: Michael Tierney
- Headquarters: El Paso, Texas, United States
- Area served: United States
- Products: Marshmallows
- Website: stuffedpuffs.com

Stuffed Puffs (officially Stuffed Puffs LLC) is an American confection company specializing in chocolate filled-marshmallows founded in 2012 and based in El Paso, Texas.

== History ==
The Stuffed Puffs company was founded in 2012 by Michael Tierney of Long Island, New York, while the marshmallow itself was invented by him 4 years back in 2008 while sitting in a friend's backyard by a campfire making s'mores. In an interview with Dave Knox of Forbes, Tierney explained the invention as; "What bothered me about the traditional s’more was that the chocolate never melted. It never looked like that TV commercial of that really ooey, gooey chocolatey s’more. It was always ice cold and slid around the graham cracker, like a hockey puck on ice. As I was sitting there, I ripped a marshmallow in half and shoved a piece of chocolate inside and put it over the fire. And of course it melted from the inside out." Tierney founded Mikey's, a brand of gluten free foods to raise capital for his Stuffed Puffs brand. Later in 2018, Mikey's partnered with Factory, LLC, which led to Stuffed Puffs being put into production in Bethlehem, Pennsylvania. In 2019, Stuffed Puffs began selling in Walmart stores.

For summer of 2021, Stuffed Puffs launched its "Fluffing Delicious" television advertisement campaign featuring DJ Marshmello produced by Anonymous Content. This is the company's first national advertisement campaign.

In 2024, Stuffed Puffs closed their Bethlehem facility and moved all production to Texas after being purchased by Mountain Franklin Foods, LLC.

== Flavors ==
Stuffed Puffs currently markets three flavors of filled marshmallows; milk chocolate, double chocolate, and cookies and cream, which are branded as Classic Milk Chocolate, Chocolate-on-Chocolate, and Cookies 'n Creme respectively. The marshmallows are only available in 8.6 oz resealable bags, but Costco markets them in 3-pack boxes.

For Christmas in 2020, Stuffed Puffs sold a limited edition flavor called Chocolate Peppermint Bark. For Easter 2021, the company sold pastel-colored classic flavor marshmallows.

For Halloween in 2022, Stuffed Puffs launched the Monster Marsh flavor, which are green marshmallows filled with chocolate and covered in sprinkles.
