= Tom Tierney (Kilkenny hurler) =

Irish hurler

Thomas Tierney (30 October 1894 – 25 March 1984) was an Irish hurler. Usually lining out as a corner-back, he was a substitute on the Kilkenny senior hurling team that won the 1922 All-Ireland Championship.

== Honours ==
Kilkenny

- All-Ireland Senior Hurling Championship (1): 1922
- Leinster Senior Hurling Championship (1): 1922
