= Charles Rust-Tierney =

Charles Rust-Tierney is a former president of the Virginia chapter of the American Civil Liberties Union (ACLU) from 2002 to 2005. On February 23, 2007, Rust-Tierney was arrested and charged with possession of child pornography. He pleaded guilty to one count of receipt of child pornography on June 1, 2007.

At the time of his arrest, Rust-Tierney was a member of the Virginia ACLU's board of directors, but he resigned his position after he was arrested. Rust-Tierney also performed a role under Volunteers in Service to America for the Iowa Civil Rights Commission. He has been an advocate for civil rights, and was a faculty member at the Benchmark Institute (an institution centering on social justice and "fostering change to meet the needs of an increasingly diverse population").

== Child pornography scandal ==
Rust-Tierney was arrested on charges of possession of child pornography on February 23, 2007. Federal investigators tracked the use of Rust-Tierney's credit card and web site pornography habits over a period of several years. Rust-Tierney's preliminary hearing was held on Wednesday February 28, 2007, at the United States district court in Alexandria, Virginia. He was formally accused of receiving and possessing child pornography, and investigators offered evidence obtained as a result of searching his home.

Prior to this, Rust-Tierney had argued in court on behalf of his client, the ACLU, against anti-pornography filters on public library computers.

On May 10, 2007, Rust-Tierney was indicted by a federal grand jury in U.S. District Court in Alexandria, on one count of receiving child pornography and one count of possessing child pornography. On June 1, 2007, he pleaded guilty to one count of receipt of child pornography. On September 7, 2007, Rust-Tierney was sentenced to seven years in federal prison. On April 25, 2008, the Virginia State Bar Disciplinary Board revoked his bar license. He was incarcerated at Federal Correctional Institution (FCI) in Jesup, Georgia, a medium security facility housing male offenders. He was released on March 30, 2012.
