= Journal of Literacy Research =

- Discipline: Literacy, education
- Language: English
- Edited by: Misty Sailors

Publication details
- Former name: Journal of Reading Behavior
- History: 1969-present
- Publisher: SAGE Publications on behalf of the Literacy Research Association
- Frequency: Quarterly
- Impact factor: 1.71 (2017)

Standard abbreviations
- ISO 4: J. Lit. Res.

Indexing
- ISSN: 1086-296X (print); 1554-8430 (web)
- LCCN: 96660095
- OCLC no.: 819148805

Links
- Journal homepage; Online access; Online archive

The Journal of Literacy Research a quarterly peer-reviewed academic journal covering research related to literacy, language, and literacy and language education from preschool through adulthood. It was established in 1969 and is published by SAGE Publications on behalf of the Literacy Research Association. The editor-in-chief is Misty Sailors (University of Texas at San Antonio).

== Abstracting and indexing ==
The journal is abstracted and indexed in Current Contents/Social & Behavioral Sciences, Scopus, and the Social Sciences Citation Index. According to the Journal Citation Reports, the journal has a 2017 impact factor of 1.71.
