= Tierney Gearon =

American photographer (born 1963)

- Born: 9 September 1963 (age 62); Atlanta, Georgia, US
- Known for: Photography

Tierney Gearon (born 9 September 1963) is an American photographer who came to prominence in Britain after a media controversy over her work at the Saatchi Gallery.

She was born in Atlanta, Georgia. She had no formal art training, but studied ballet in Utah, where a European model agency saw her. This led to five years of modeling and traveling the world. During this time she took up photography herself. A Paris agent saw some of her Polaroid photos and encouraged her to do more work. She then became a fashion photographer for five years. Her work was used in magazines and on Times Square billboards.

Her personal work often revolves around her family and friends. She considers it "the diary of my soul." She started photographing her children and that work was eventually shown in the "I Am a Camera" exhibition at Saatchi Gallery. She then started photographing her mother. That work was shown as an exhibition called "The Mother project" and 70 images were published as a book and called "Daddy, where are you?".

Large blow-ups of her photos of her two children (daughter age seven and son age four) were exhibited in 2001 the show I Am a Camera at the Saatchi Gallery in March 2001. These included two naked poses and one of her son urinating in the snow. There were three complaints by members of the public, and the police visited the gallery twice, causing a great deal of media coverage, debating the rights and wrongs of such work, generally in favor of Gearon. The press reported police threats to seize the work, but this was denied by the police and no further action was taken.

2003 her work was included in the book "British Artists At Work" along with 46 other artists, for Italian Vogue editor Franca Sozzani, with photographs by Amanda Eliasch and text by Gemma de Cruz.

2008 Gearon was given her first solo show in London with Phillip du Pury, Auction House. Exhibition containing double exposures. [WWD]

2009 The Ace Gallery Los Angeles. The double exposure project. Explosure

2012 In partnership with the New York Times Magazine, Tearney was asked to make a series of short films.

2013 a new book came out "Tierney Gearon: The Alphabet Book", "Shape Color", and For the book, Gearon collaborated with her two youngest children, of her four, to make scenes for each letter of the alphabet. Scenes include "Naughty Nurse" and "Private Princess. The work was published as a book in 2013 by Damiani.

== Tierney Gearon: The Mother Project ==
Tierney Gearon in 2006 was the subject of a documentary film titled "Tierney Gearon: The Mother Project." The film by Jack Youngelson & Peter Sutherland follows the artist as she photographs her mother. During the course of the film, she moves back to the United States and has another child. The controversy surrounding the photographs of her children is talked about and Gearon speaks the current difficulties of photographing her mentally ill mother. The film was released in 2007.

She is a contributor for Above magazine. Her work is widely collected and is in Saatchi's collection, the Scottish National Portrait Gallery, and Phillips de Pury & Company in London. She is represented by Yossi Milo Gallery in New York City and Jackson Fine Art in Atlanta, Georgia.

== Monographs ==
- "Daddy, Where are You". Steidl. (2008) (ISBN 386521309X)
- "Tierney Gearon: Alphabet Book." Damiani. (2013) (ISBN 8862083203)
