= Jacobus Ó Cethernaig =

Jacobus Ó Cethernaig, a.k.a. James O'Kearney was Bishop of Annaghdown during 1323–1324 and Bishop of Connor during 1324–1351.

Ó Cethernaig wa appointed to Annaghdown on 16 December 1323 but was translated from Connor between 7 and 15 May 1324. He received possession of the temporalities on 22 December 1324. He died 1351. He was a native of either County Galway or County Mayo.

== See also ==
- Catholic Church in Ireland

Catholic Church titles
Preceded by Gilbert Ó Tigernaig	Bishop of Annaghdown; 1323–1324	Succeeded by Robert Petit
Preceded by Robert Wirsop	Bishop of Connor; 1324–1351	Succeeded by William Mercier
