= T. F. Tierney =

American urbanist, network theorist and educator

Thérèse Frances Tierney (born June 8, 1951) is an American urbanist, network theorist, and educator. She is the director of the Urban Research Lab at the University of Illinois at Urbana–Champaign.

== Biography ==
Born in Palo Alto, California, Tierney grew up in a post-war Eichler house designed by Ashen & Allen Architects, fostering an early interest in architecture and urban design. Tierney graduated from Palo Alto High School.

From 1998 to 2002, she studied architecture at California College of the Arts. From 2002 to 2009, Tierney was a Malcolm Reynolds Fellow at the University of California Berkeley, where she developed a theory of networked urbanism, for which she was awarded her doctorate in 2009 with a designated emphasis in new media. in 2006, Tierney was a predoctoral researcher at the MIT Media lab during William Mitchell’s tenure as director. She began teaching at University of Illinois Urbana Champaign in 2009.

=== Research ===
Tierney has played a formative role in the conceptualization of networked space. Kelsey Brennan assesses Tierney’ theories this way:

“Michel de Certeau’s framework of “space as practiced place…allows Tierney to argue that the actions performed and messages exchanged in online communities around niche interests are in fact spatial practices that weave places together. Which, of course, disrupts our traditional understanding of place as involving a relatively fixed series of spatial relationships.”

In 2013, as founding director of URL: Urban Research Lab, Tierney was one of ten delegates for Smart & Digital Cities, organized by the Consulate General of France in San Francisco. This experience contributed to a more holistic understanding of networked technologies in urban contexts.

Considering Tierney’s infrastructural proposals for smart cities, Emma French, Georgia Institute of Technology wrote, “Several themes emerge: The first is that intelligent infrastructure in many cases is leading cities away from centralized transportation hubs and toward more decentralized, user-driven nodes….The second theme, somewhat connected to the first, is that the best intelligent infrastructure is place-based…The third theme is that intelligent infrastructure is not a panacea, and in the worst cases can even reinforce existing inequalities related to urban transportation networks and social mobility more broadly.”

Tierney authored The Public Space of Social Media: Connected Cultures of the Network Society, a finalist for the Jane Jacob Urban Communication Award [link], and more than 25 other publications on intelligent infrastructure, smart cities, and networked mobility. Those publications advance the notion that “the future of urbanism depends on conceptualizing infrastructure not as a means of optimization, data collection, or control, but as a connective tissue of social relations binding a city together”.

== Reception ==
John Hill, editor of World Architecture.com, says that Tierney’s approach to network urbanism tends towards “technological optimism”, more recently, she has emerged as a critic of smart cities by arguing for a more humanistic approach to their design.

== Works ==
=== Books ===
- Tierney, T. F., Editor. (2017, 2nd ed. 2018) Intelligent Infrastructure: Zipcars, Invisible Networks & Urban Transformation. Charlotte, VA: University of Virginia Press · ISBN 0813939488
- Tierney, Thérèse. (2013, 2nd ed. 2018) The Public Space of Social Media: Connected Cultures of the Network Society. London, Routledge Inc. · ISBN 1138649309
- ---- (2007). Abstract Space: Beneath the Media Surface. London: Routledge Inc. · ISBN 0415415098
- ----; Anthony Burke, Editors (2007). Network Practice: New Strategies for Architecture and Design. New York: Princeton Architectural Press. · ISBN 1568987013

=== Exhibitions ===
- Tierney, T.F. Group Exhibition: Now/There: Scenes from the Post-Geographic City, winner of Bronze Dragon Award. Mimi Zeiger and Tim Durfee co-curators, Shenzhen Bi-City Biennale of Urbanism + Architecture. https://archinect.com/news/article/147195686/bonus-session-scenes-from-the-post-geographic-city Accessed 3 December 2019.
- Tierney, T.F. “Transit-Oriented Developments: Optimized, On-Demand, and Networked” poster project. Disrupting Mobilities Global Summit 2015, Ryan Chin and Susan Shaheen co-organizers. Cambridge, MA (November 11–13, 2015) https://www.disrupting-mobility.org/overview#poster Accessed 3 December 2019.
