= Tommy Tierney =

English footballer

Personal information
- Full name: Thomas Timothy Tierney
- Date of birth: 1875
- Place of birth: Chester, England
- Position: Inside forward

Senior career*
Years	Team	Apps	(Gls)
1892–1893	Witton Albion		
1893–1894	Northwich Victoria	4	(1)
1894–1895	Chorley		
1895–1897	Blackburn Rovers	20	(3)
1897–1898	New Brighton Tower		
1897	→ Blackburn Rovers (loan)	1	(0)
1898–1899	Chorley		
1899–1900	New Brighton Tower	30	(5)
1901–1902	Luton Town		
1902–1903	Gainsborough Trinity	3	(0)
1903–1904	Barrow		
1904	Glentoran		
1904	Watford		
1905	Chorley		
Total		58	(9)
- * Club domestic league appearances and goals

Thomas Timothy Tierney (1875 – unknown) was an English footballer who played in the Football League for Blackburn Rovers, Gainsborough Trinity, New Brighton Tower and Northwich Victoria.
