= Bishop of Annaghdown =

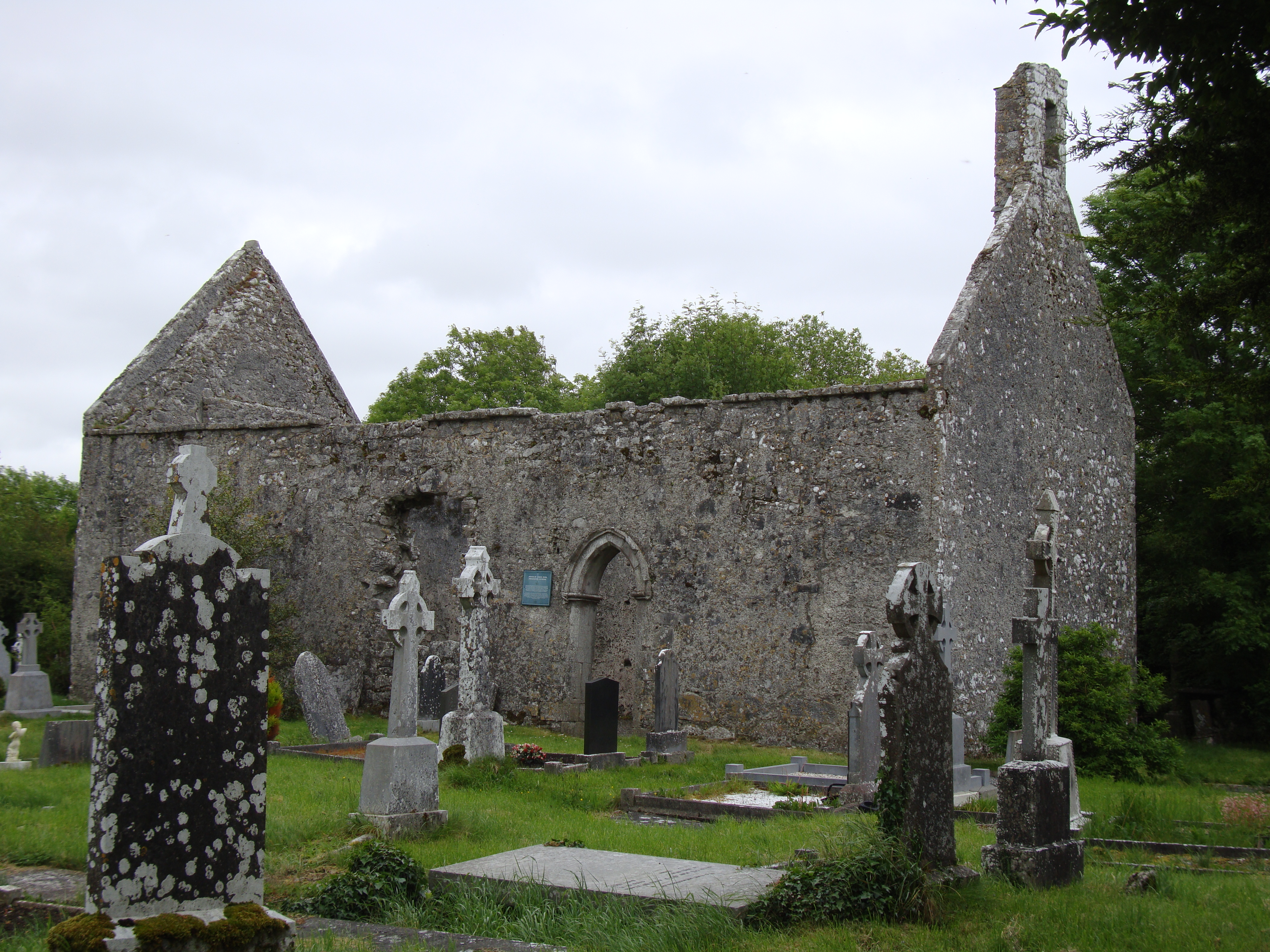
The historic cathedral for the Bishopric

The Bishop of Annaghdown (or Annadown, Enachdune, Eanach Dúin) is an episcopal title which takes its name after the small village of Annaghdown in County Galway, Ireland.

The bishop was originally the ordinary of the diocese of Annaghdown, which was established in the 12th century. The cathedral had a dean, chapter and four vicars choral. Between 1253 and 1306, the bishopric was united to the archbishopric of Tuam, although in this period there were two bishops.

During the Reformation, there were two bishoprics; one of the Church of Ireland and the other of the Roman Catholic Church. They were re-united under Queen Mary I. After 1555, Annaghdown was held by the Archbishops of Tuam. The union of the two was finally decreed on 17 October 1580.

In 1970, the Roman Catholic Church revived the title as the Titular Bishop of Eanach Dúin. It is currently held by Bishop Octavio Cisneros, Auxiliary Bishop of Brooklyn, New York, who was appointed on 6 June 2006.

== Pre-Reformation bishops ==
Pre-Reformation Bishops of Annaghdown
From	Until	Ordinary	Notes
bef. 1189	1202	Conn Ua Mellaig	Present at the coronation of Richard I of England (17 September 1189); died in office; also known as Concors
c.1202	1241	Murchad Ua Flaithbertaig	Died in office
c.1242	1247 or 1250	Tomas Ó Mellaig, O.Praem.	Consecrated circa 1242; acted as a suffragan bishop in the Diocese of Lincoln 1246; possibly deprived of the bishopric 28 May 1247; died after 27 May 1250
1251	unknown	Conchobar of Annaghdown	Elected before 12 January 1251; took control of temporalities after 8 May 1251; also known as Concors
1253	1306	The bishopric and its temporalities were united to the archbishopric of Tuam, although there were two bishops during this period. The first was Thomas, who died before 12 September 1263. The second was John de Ufford, who was elected before 14 March 1283, but never consecrated, and resigned circa 1289	
1306	1323	Gilbert Ó Tigernaig, O.F.M.	Elected circa 1306; consecrated before 15 July 1308; took control of temporalities 15 July 1508; acted as a suffragan bishop in the dioceses of Winchester 1313, Worcester 1313–1314 and Hereford 1315; died before 16 December 1322
1323	1324	Jacobus Ó Cethernaig	Appointed 16 December 1323; translated to Connor between 7 and 15 May 1324
1325	1328	Robert Petit, O.F.M.	Formerly Bishop of Clonfert 1320–1323; appointed 8 November 1325; took control of temporalities after 22 June 1326; acted as a suffragan bishop in the Diocese of Salisbury 1326; died 28 April 1328; also known as Robert Le Petit
1328	unknown	Albertus	Appointed before September 1328; took control of temporalities 23 September 1328
1329	unknown	Tomas Ó Mellaig	Elected circa 1328 or 1329, but never consecrated
1359	unknown	Dionysius	Elected before March 1359, but probably never consecrated
1393	1394	Johannes	Appointed before 6 July 1393; died before October 1394
1394	1402	Henry Trillow, O.F.M.	Appointed 26 October 1394; acted as a suffragan bishop in the dioceses of Exeter, Salisbury and Winchester 1394–1401; died before 25 January 1402
1402	aft.1420	John Bryt, O.F.M.	Appointed 25 January 1402; acted as a suffragan bishop in the dioceses of Winchester 1402, Lincoln 1403-1403 and York 1417–1420; died after 1420
1408	unknown	John Wynn	Appointed before 17 December 1408
unknown	1421	Henricus (or Matthaeus)	Died before June 1421
1421	1446	John Boner, O.S.A.	Appointed 9 June 1421; acted as a suffragan bishop in the dioceses of Salisbury and Hereford in 1421 and Exeter in 1438; died before 1446; also known as John Camere
1425	unknown	Seeán Mac Brádaigh, O.Carm.	Appointed 15 October 1425
1428	1429	Seamus Ó Lonnghargáin	Appointed 10 December 1428; translated to Killaloe 9 December 1429
1431	unknown	Donatus Ó Madagáin	Appointed 19 November 1431
1446	aft.1458	Thomas Salscot	Appointed 8 July 1446; acted as a suffragan bishop in dioceses of Lincoln in 1449 and Exeter 1458; died after 1458
1450	1451	Redmund Bermingham	Appointed 18 May 1450; consecrated May 1450; died 1451
1458	aft.1485	Thomas Barrett	Known in Irish as Tomás Bairéad. Appointed on 17 April 1458; acted as a suffragan bishop in the dioceses of Exeter in 1458 and 1468–1475, and the Bath and Wells 1482–1485; died after 1485
1494/96	aft.1504	Francois Brunand, O.Carm.	Appointed after 4 December 1594 or on 8 February 1496; acted as a suffragan bishop in Geneva; died after 1504
c.1504	c.1539	See vacant	

== Post-Reformation bishops ==
=== Church of Ireland succession ===
Church of Ireland Bishops of Annaghdown
From	Until	Ordinary	Notes
bef.1540	aft.1553	John O'More	He was imprisoned on the grounds that he had accepted the bishopric from the pope, although there was no record of a papal provision; he was released in 1540 and then appears to have been recognised by the Crown; in 1551 and 1553, he was officially referred to as the bishop of the see; died after 1553; also known as John O'Moore
After 1555, Annaghdown was united to the Archbishopric of Tuam

=== Roman Catholic succession ===
Roman Catholic Bishops of Annaghdown
From	Until	Ordinary	Notes
1540	unknown	Henry de Burgo	Appointed 16 April 1540; death date unknown
After 1555, Annaghdown was held by the Archbishops of Tuam. The union of the Diocese of Annaghdown and the Archdiocese of Tuam was finally decreed on 17 October 1580.

== Titular bishops of Eanach Dúin ==
Titular Bishops of Eanach Dúin
From	Until	Ordinary	Notes
1970	1992	Gerald Mahon	Appointed titular bishop of Eanach Dúin and auxiliary bishop of Westminster, England on 24 April 1970; ordained bishop 23 May 1970; died 29 January 1992
1992	1995	John Jerome Cunneen	Appointed titular bishop of Eanach Dúin and auxiliary bishop of Christchurch, New Zealand on 6 October 1992; ordained bishop 30 November 1992; appointed diocesan bishop of Christchurch on 15 December 1995
1995	2000	Titular see vacant	
2000	2003	Michael Aidan Courtney	Appointed titular archbishop of Eanach Dúin and apostolic nuncio to Burundi on 18 August 2000; ordained archbishop 12 November 2000; assassinated 29 December 2003
2003	2006	Titular see vacant	
2006	present	Octavio Cisneros	Appointed titular bishop of Eanach Dúin and auxiliary bishop of Brooklyn, New York on 6 June 2006; ordained bishop 22 August 2006

== See also ==
- Annaghdown Abbey

== Bibliography ==
- Cotton, Henry (1850). The Province of Connaught. Fasti Ecclesiae Hiberniae: The Succession of the Prelates and Members of the Cathedral Bodies of Ireland. Vol. IV. Dublin: Hodges and Smith.
- Fryde, E. B.; Greenway, D. E.; Porter, S.; Roy, I., eds. (1986). Handbook of British Chronology (3rd, Reprinted 2003 ed.). Cambridge: Cambridge University Press. ISBN 0-521-56350-X.
- Moody, T. W.; Martin, F. X.; Byrne, F. J., eds. (1984). Maps, Genealogies, Lists: A Companion to Irish History, Part II. New History of Ireland. Vol. XI. Oxford: Oxford University Press. ISBN 0-19-821745-5.
