= Gilbert Ó Tigernaig =

Irish bishop

- Predecessor: John de Ufford
- Successor: Jacobus Ó Cethernaig

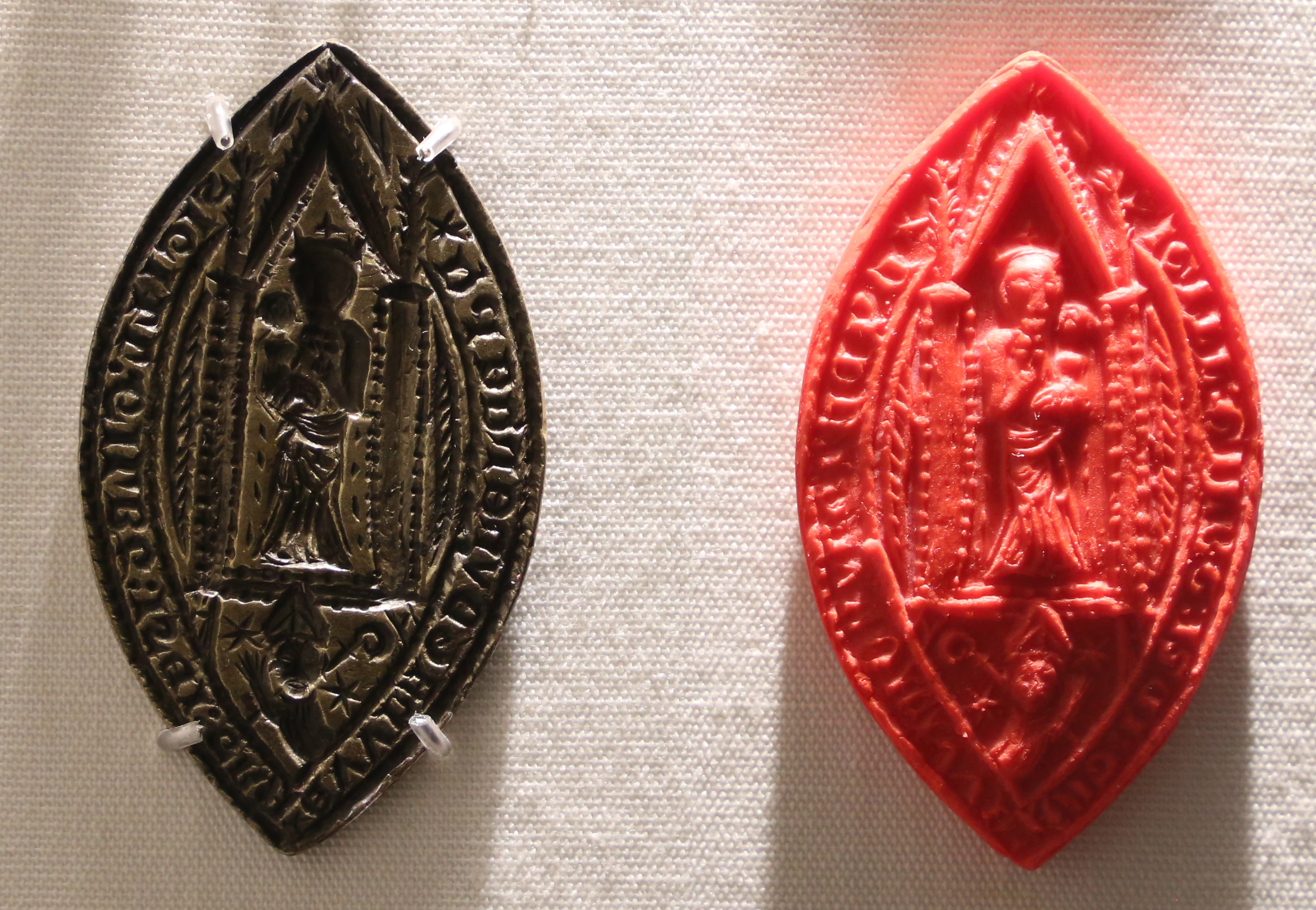
Seal of Gilbert Ó Tigernaig

Gilbert Ó Tigernaig was the Bishop of Annaghdown from 1306 to 1323.

Ó Tigernaig was a native of Carra, County Mayo, his family belonging to those ruling the area, subject to (or descended from) the Uí Fiachrach Muaidhe. The surname is now rendered as "Tierney".

Elected about 1306, Ó Tigernaig had been consecrated a bishop by 15 July 1308, taking control of the temporalities of Annaghdown on 15 July 1308. He also acted as a suffragan bishop in the dioceses of Winchester (1313), Worcester (1313–1314) and Hereford (1315). He died before 16 December 1323, in England, where he had been serving as suffragan in the Diocese of Coventry and Lichfield.

Catholic Church titles
Preceded by John de Ufford	Bishop of Annaghdown; 1306–1323	Succeeded by Jacobus Ó Cethernaig
