= Jim Tierney (footballer) =

Scottish footballer

Personal information
- Full name: James McMahon Tierney
- Date of birth: 2 May 1940 (age 86)
- Place of birth: Ayr, Scotland
- Position: Winger

Senior career*
| Years | Team | Apps | (Gls) |
- Saltcoats Victoria
| 1960–1962 | Bradford City | 2 | (0) |
| 1962–1963 | Ayr United | 6 | (1) |
- Glenafton Athletic
| Total | | 8 | (1) |
- * Club domestic league appearances and goals

Jim Tierney (born 2 May 1940) is a Scottish former professional footballer who played as a winger.

== Career ==
Born in Ayr, Tierney played for Saltcoats Victoria, Bradford City, Ayr United and Glenafton Athletic.
