= James W. Tierney Jr. =

American politician

Member of the New Hampshire House of Representatives from the Coos 1st district
- Incumbent
- Assumed office December 7, 2022
- Succeeded by: Amy Norris (elect)

Personal details
- Party: Republican

James W. Tierney Jr. is an American politician. He serves as a Republican member for the Coos 1st district of the New Hampshire House of Representatives.
