= Ronald Tierney =

American novelist

Ronald Tierney (December 12, 1944 – September 5, 2017) was an American mystery writer.

Tierney was born in Indianapolis, Indiana, birthplace of Tierney's fictional character Dietrich (Deets) Shanahan. After years as a writer, newspaper editor and communications director, Tierney began writing mysteries in the late 1980s.

The Stone Veil introduces semi-retired, Indianapolis-based private investigator Deets Shanahan. The first in a series of eleven novels, The Stone Veil was a finalist in St. Martin's Press "Best First Private Eye Novel" competition. It was also nominated for the Private Eye Writers of America's Shamus Award for "Best First Novel." After Moving to San Francisco, Tierney embarked on a second series involving the strong and passionate Carly Paladino, the lead investigator for a large, prestigious San Francisco security firm and the down on his luck, streetwise P.I. Noah Lang. Tierney was a member of the Authors Guild, Mystery Writers of America, and the Private Eye Writers of America. Tierney's novels have been published by the UK's Severn House, St. Martin's Press and Dutton (Penguin Group).

== The "Deets" Shanahan series ==
- The Stone Veil, 1990
- The Steel Web, 1991
- The Iron Glove, 1992
- The Concrete Pillow, 1995
- Nickel-Plated Soul, 2005
- Platinum Canary, 2005
- Glass Chameleon, 2006
- Asphalt Moon, 2007
- Bloody Palms, 2008
- Bullet Beach, 2010
- Killing Frost, 2015

== The Carly Paladino / Noah Lang mysteries ==
- Death in Pacific Heights, 2009
- Death in North Beach, 2010
- Mascara, Death in the Tenderloin, 2011, novella
- Death in the Haight, 2012, novella

== Other novels ==
- Eclipse of the Heart, 1993
- Good to the Last Kiss, 2011
- Blue Dragon, 2015, novella
