= Sotavento Algarvio =

Coordinates: 37°15′N 7°50′W

Sotavento is the eastern region of the Algarve, comprising the municipalities of Alcoutim, Castro Marim, Faro, Loulé, Olhão, São Brás de Alportel, Tavira, and Vila Real de Santo António.

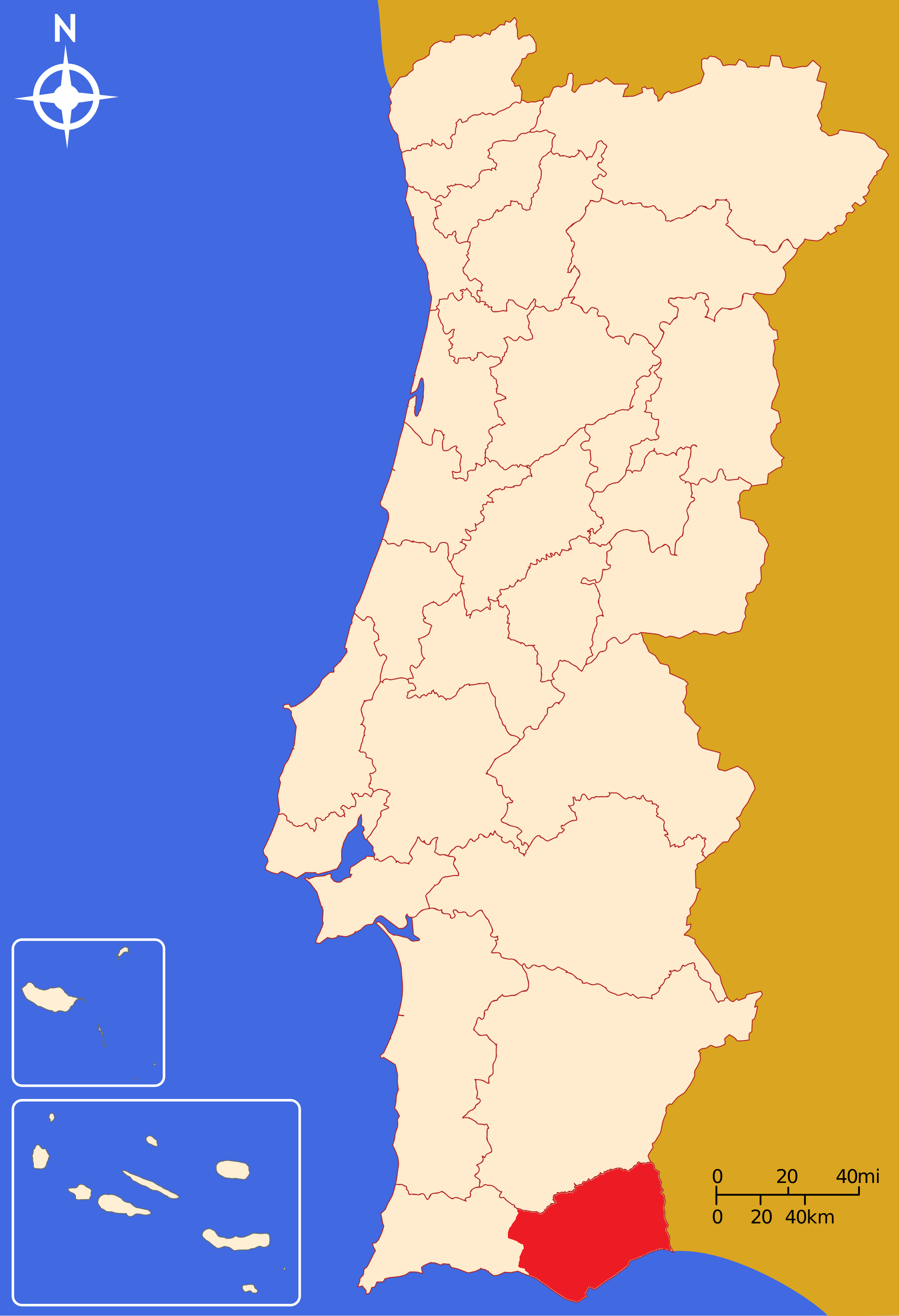

== See also ==
- Barlavento Algarvio
