= Barlavento Algarvio =

Coordinates: 37°15′N 8°27′W

Barlavento is the western region of the Algarve, comprising the municipalities of Albufeira, Aljezur, Lagoa, Lagos, Monchique, Portimão, Silves and Vila do Bispo.

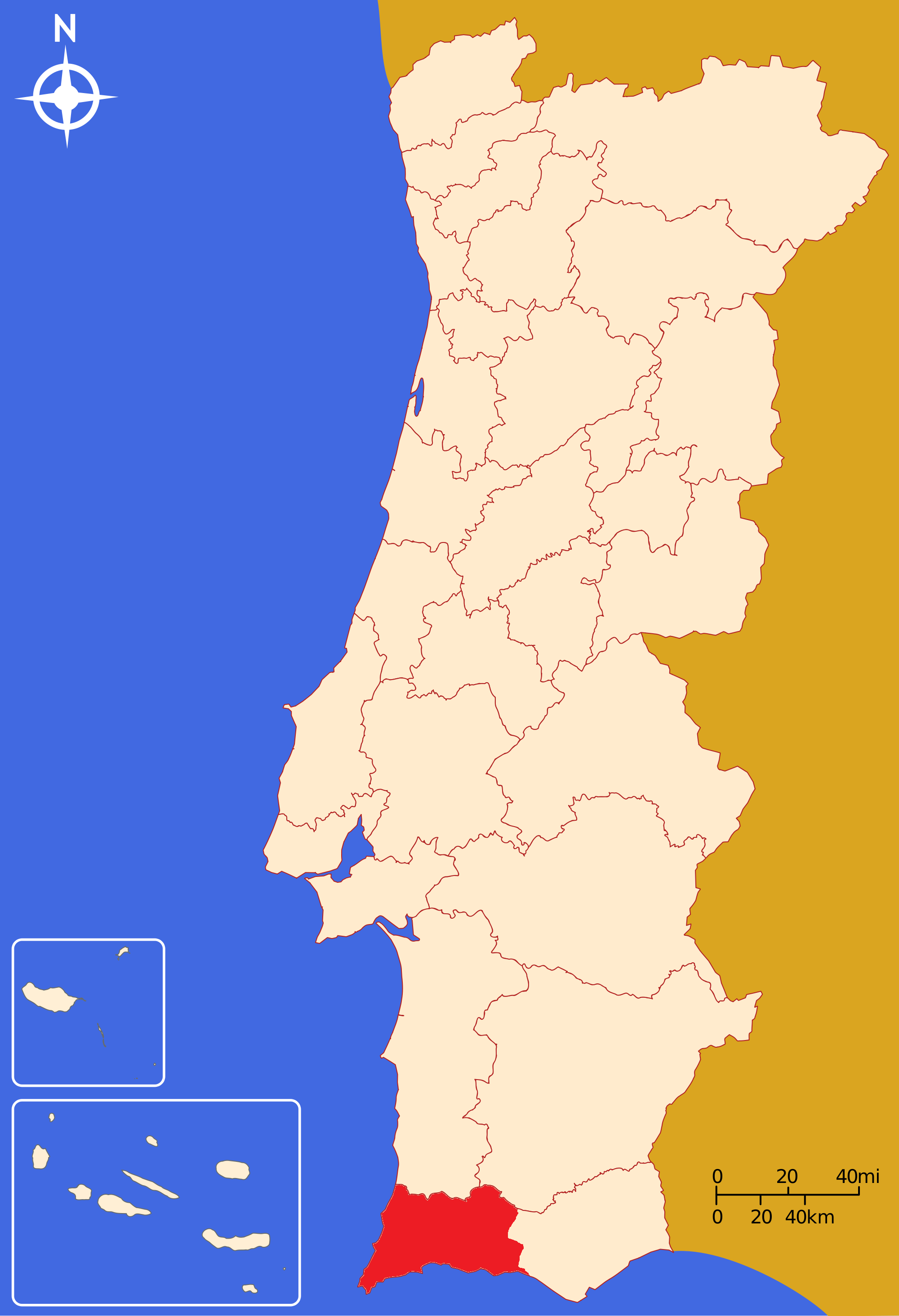

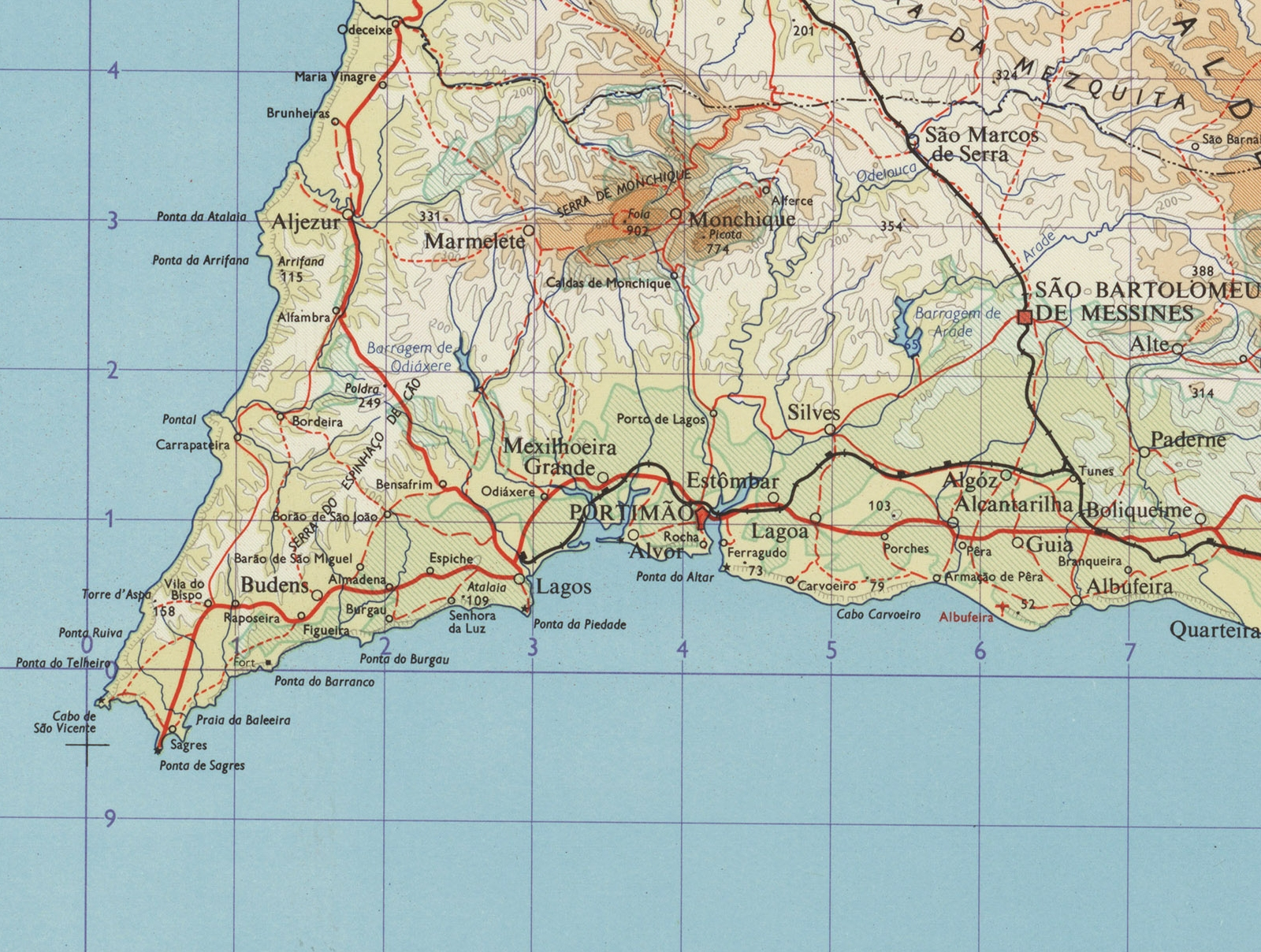
On a 1965 map

== See also ==
- Sotavento Algarvio
