= Tigernach Ua Braín =

11th century Irish abbot

Tigernach Ua Braín (died 1088) was abbot of Clonmacnoise and abbot of Roscommon. He was once held to be the author of the Annals of Tigernach, hence its name; this view is no longer sustainable, though the nature and extent of his involvement remain unclear.

== The Uí Braín and Clonmacnoise ==
The annalistic compilation known as the Chronicon Scotorum mentions that he was 'heir of Ciarán and of Commán', that is abbot of Clonmacnoise and Roscommon, and came from the Síol Muireadaigh (Síl Muiredaig), descendants of Muiredach Muillethan (d. 702), a ruling sept of the Connachta Uí Briúin dynasty. The Uí Braín were a branch of the Síl Muiredaig, but being no player in the race for kingship, focused on Clonmacnoise to pursue a career in the church instead. The first known Uí Braín member to become abbot of Clonmacnoise was Dúnchad Ua Braín (d. 989) and others are attested after Tigernach's life-time who also headed the abbey of Roscommon. The monastery of Clonmacnoise stood in Mide, but it had held land in Connacht since the 7th century and by the 11th century it ranked as the most important church in Connacht. Since the rulers of Mide were usually in alliance with those of Connacht, Clonmacnoise appears to have remained on good terms with the rulers of both provinces.

The Annals of Ulster and the Chronicon Scotorum record Tigernach's death under the entry for 1088.

== Annals of Tigernach ==
The copy of the Annals of Tigernach which is preserved in the 14th-century manuscript Oxford, Bodleian Library, MS Rawlinson B. 488, has a note attached to the entry for 1088, apparently the year of his death. It reports that Tigernach had written the text up to that point, but does not specify whether he had merely written down the text or was (also) the annalist responsible for the entries. T.M. Charles-Edwards considers it a good possibility that Tigernach was one of a succession of annalists.
