= Daniel O'Kearney =

Irish prelate

Styles of Daniel O'Kearney
- Reference style: The Right Reverend
- Spoken style: My Lord or Bishop

Daniel O'Kearney (died 1778) was an Irish prelate who served in the Roman Catholic Church as the Bishop of Limerick from 1759 to 1778.

He was appointed the Bishop of the Roman Catholic Diocese of Limerick by a papal brief on 27 November 1759 and consecrated on 27 January 1760.

He died in office on 24 January 1778.

Catholic Church titles
Preceded by Robert Lacy	Bishop of Limerick; 1759–1778	Succeeded by Denis Conway
