= Careena Melia =

Irish-American actress

- Born: Galway, Ireland
- Education: Sarah Lawrence College (BA); Harvard University (MFA)

Careena Melia is an Irish-American actress.

== Early life and education ==
Melia was born in Galway, Ireland and moved to Massachusetts when she was five years old. A student of ballet, she trained at Walnut Hill School, Boston Ballet, the Central Pennsylvania Youth Ballet and the Centre de Danse International in France. She studied at Sarah Lawrence College and as a theater and English major at Trinity College, Dublin. She received an MFA from the Institute for Advanced Theater Training.

== Career ==
Following her graduation, she moved to New York City to begin a career in acting. Her work in TV and film has featured her alongside actors such as Sissy Spacek, Dustin Hoffman, Keir Dullea, Jake Gyllenhaal and Beau Bridges.

Melia has spent much of the past ten years performing on the stage. She has worked with American Repertory Theater, Moscow Art Theater and the British 'immersive' company, Punchdrunk. From 2009 to 2013, Melia was a senior company member and performer in the award-winning production of Sleep No More, for which she created and originated the role of Hecate. She also created additional material for the role of Matron Lang. In 2012 she was part of the MIT/ NESTA project at Sleep No More which utilized online gaming and live video. Melia has performed in Off-Broadway productions such as Macbeth (by Theater for a New Audience), Anne Frank and Me (with the American Jewish Theater), and the Irish Repertory Theater's new plays series. Regionally she has worked at Berkshire Theatre Festival, The Huntington Theatre, Pittsburgh Public Theatre, Shakespeare Center of Los Angeles, GeVa Theatre, and Great Lakes Theatre Festival.

In 2014 she founded Walden Shakespeare which is in residence in Massachusetts at NARA Park Amphitheater. In 2017 she premiered The Gertrude Bell Project, a solo show based on the life of British explorer, politician and spy Gertrude Bell, at Boston Center for the Arts.

== Filmography ==
=== Film ===
Year	Title	Role	Notes
1998	Two Way Crossing	Sara	
2000	Under Hellgate Bridge	Doreen	
2001	XCU: Extreme Close Up	Parker Eastman Clarke	
2001	My Best Friend's Wife	Wife	
2002	Moonlight Mile	Diana Floss	
2018	Kill the Monsters	Nadja	

=== Television ===
Year	Title	Role	Notes
2000	Touched by an Angel	Fiona	Episode: "Life Before Death"
2000	Songs in Ordinary Time	Alice Fermoyle	Television film
2001	18 Wheels of Justice	Sarah	Episode: "Honor Thy Father"
2002	JAG	Mary Tenney	Episode: "All Ye Faithful"
