= Cian Melia =

Irish showjumper

Cian Melia is from Galway. He has participated in many shows. Along with Michael Duffy and Kate MacDonagh he has jumped in many pony classes. At the August 2010 Ballinasloe Horse Show, he and Bungowla Pressure came first in the 1.20 class in the main sand arena. He also won the Puissance class, clearing the big wall at 1.95m. He won the Leading Rider Prize.
