= Portuguese conquest of the Algarve =

- Part of the Reconquista
Date	1238 – 1249
Location	Algarve, Portugal
Result	Portuguese victory

Belligerents
Kingdom of Portugal; Order of Santiago; Order of Calatrava	Emirate of Algarve

Commanders and leaders
Afonso III of Portugal; Paio Peres Correia; Lourenço Afonso	Musa Ibn Muhammad Ibn Nassir Ibn Mahfuz

The Portuguese conquest of the Algarve, the southern-most region in modern-day Portugal, occurred between 1238, when the castle of Estômbar was captured by the Order of Santiago, and 1249, when king Afonso III of Portugal captured Faro, Loulé, Aljezur, Porches and Albufeira.

The Portuguese led by king Sancho I had already once captured Silves and the western Algarve in 1189, however this territory was retaken by the Almohad Caliphate just two years after. The majority of the Algarve was retaken by the Order of Santiago led by Paio Peres Correia, until king Afonso III moved to take the last Muslim cities in Algarve in 1249.

== Context ==
The Portuguese had participated in the Reconquista practically ever since the foundation of the County of Portugal in 868.

King Sancho I had captured Silves in Algarve in 1189, however the great Muslim city was retaken by the Almohads in 1191 and all Portuguese conquests south of the Tagus river lost, with the exception of Évora, which remained in Portuguese hands, by knights of the Order of Calatrava among others. After this setback, the Portuguese nobility gradually abstained from further participation in the recapture of Muslim-held territory back to Christian dominion, preferring instead to leave such initiatives to the Catholic military Orders and the almogavars.

=== Paio Peres Correia ===
The cross of the Order of Santiago.

In 1234, the grand-master of the Order of Santiago Pedro Gonzalez Mengo decided to carry out the conquest of Alentejo and Algarve, south of the Tagus river and towards that purpose he relocated considerable men and resources to Alcácer do Sal, a town owned by the Order that was commanded by the experienced Paio Peres Correia, who was to be found there in February of that year. The Crónica da Conquista do Algarve recorded that "after he went there, immediately the moors were all in agreement and each worked towards defending their land", while previously they had been "in great disarray".

=== The Emirate of Niebla or Emirate of the West ===
The modern-day Algarve was part of a Muslim emirate, which stretched north beyond the mountain ranges of Algarve, east of the Guadiana river, and was centered on the city of Niebla, whose emir was Musa Ibn Muhammad Ibn Nassir Ibn Mahfuz, known as Aben Mafom in Portuguese chronicles.

Ibn Mahfuz had fled from Seville when Ibn Hud took control of government in this city and defeated the faction headed by al-Baji, whom Ibn Mahfuz was a follower of. Having established himself at Niebla in 1234 or 1236, he took on the title of Emir of the West (Amir al-Gharb) and declared himself a vassal of Ferdinand III of Castile, in an effort to protect himself both from the Portuguese who advanced from the north as well as the Muslims who threatened him from Seville. All the cities in southeastern Iberian recognized Ibn Mahfuz as their leader.

Paio Peres Correia captured Aljustrel still in 1234. In 1238, Correia captured Mértola, which provided access to the left bank of the Guadiana river and was considered one of the strongest Muslim strongholds in western Iberia, while king Sancho II of Portugal captured Ayamonte for Portugal. The castle of Alfajar da Pena was also captured and it allowed the Portuguese to control the flatlands between Ayamonte and Saltes, Gibraleon and Huelva, which defended Niebla. From this point onwards, the Emirate of Niebla saw its land communications severed in half, but at this moment conflict sparked between Sancho and the Catholic Church, which would force the Order of Santiago to undertake the conquest of Algarve entirely on its own, without the support of the army or the fleet of the Portuguese king.

== The conquest of Algarve 1238–1249 ==
The main obstacle blocking the advance of Christian forces were the mountain ranges of Monchique and Caldeirão. Many knights were skeptical of the possibility of capturing land to the south of these mountains due to a lack of men and the uncertainty of gains. Correia however, had the support of Garcia Rodrigues, a knight who knew well the roads, defenses and vulnerabilities of Muslim Algarve due to his prior occupation as a merchant.

=== The taking of Estômbar and Alvor ===
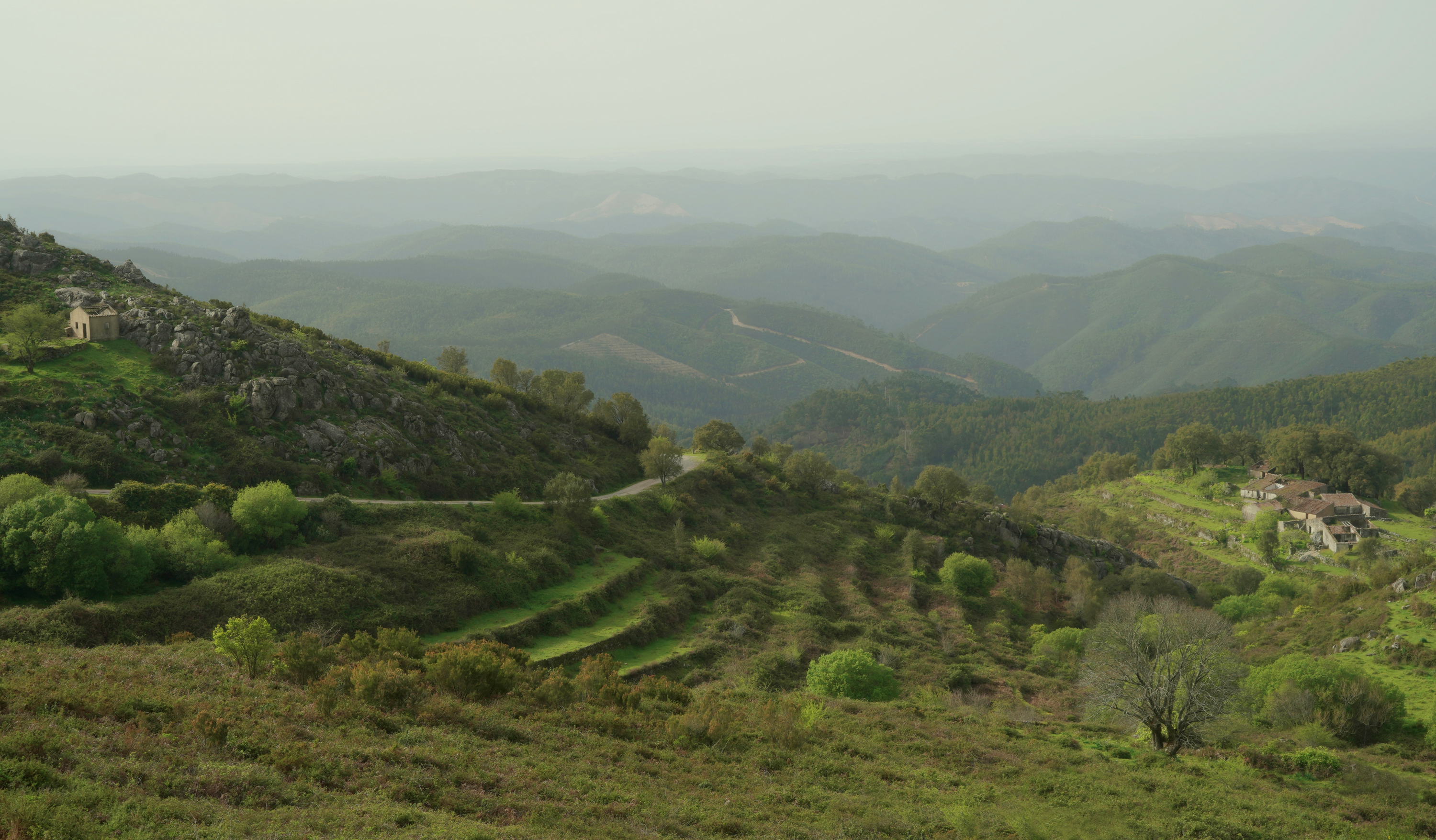
Monchique mountain range

Probably on the spring of 1238 a number of almogavars who earned a living raiding Muslim lands as frontiersmen carefully undertook the crossing of the mountains, guided by Garcia Rodrigues and marching by night and camping by day they bypassed the castle of Ourique, the first Muslim stronghold that guarded the entrance to the hills.

They captured the albacar of Estômbar by surprise and soon afterwards were joined by Paio Peres Correia, who rushed there with his men as soon as he was informed of the fact. He reinforced it with a proper garrison necessary to its defense and later captured a tower in nearby Alvor. These fortifications would serve as "counter-castles" from which the surroundings of the great Muslim city of Silves would be raided, gradually wearing down its inhabitants till the final and definitive assault. From Estômbar, Paio Peres Correia carried out numerous raids against the villages, farms and orchards of the fertile Arade river valley.

=== The exchange of Estômbar and Alvor for Cacela, October 1238 ===
Despite the acquisition of Estômbar and Alvor, the castles of Marrachique, Ourique, Messines and Montagudo defending the pathways south through the mountains were still in Muslim hands, making it difficult for the knights of Santiago to obtain fresh supplies from their bases further north, such as Aljustrel. Ibn Mahfuz on his part lacked the means to properly defend western Algarve from the incursions of the knights, hence he offered to swap the castles of Estômbar and Alvor for Cacela Velha.

The castle at Cacela Velha was larger, easier to both defend and resupply from Mértola or Ayamonte, hence it appeared like an advantageous exchange for the Order; Correia therefore accepted it and took possession of Cacela in October 1238. Ibn Mahfuz however, was aware that the lands around Cacela Velha were far less populated, while nearby Tavira was less vulnerable than Silves and the local terrain was flatter, thereby favouring the Muslim numerical advantage.

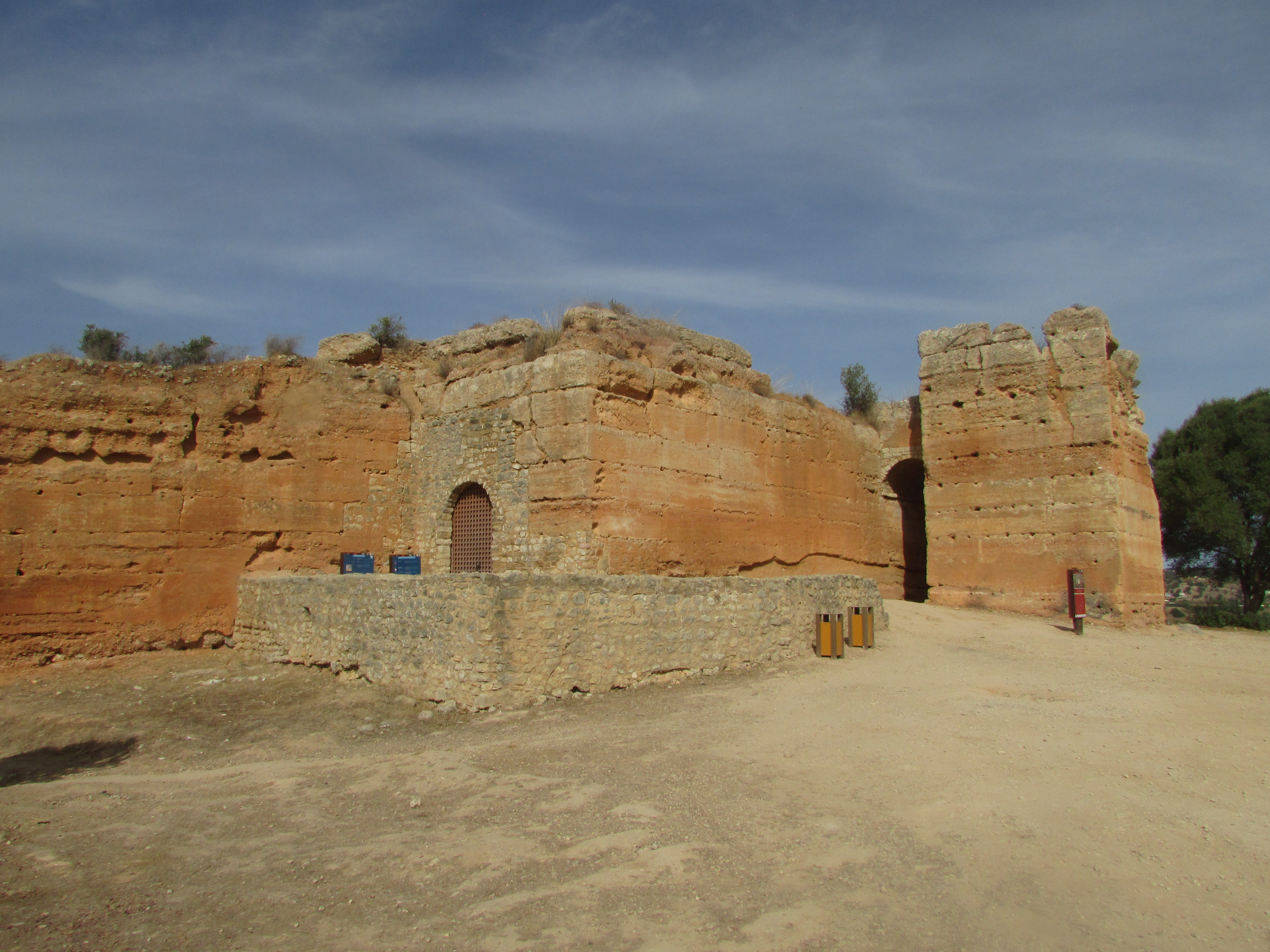
Modern-day look of Paderne castle

On June 1239 most likely, Correia attempted a surprise attack against the Castle of Paderne, which defended a road connecting eastern Algarve to Silves, and from which raids could be launched in every surrounding direction. The knights were however detected upon approach and forced to withdraw. The Muslim horsemen of Faro, Loulé and Tavira then united under the command of Ibn Fabola of Tavira so as to intercept the Christians and force them to an open field battle, but the Muslims were also detected by Christian scouts. By dawn of the following day, they were routed by a cavalry charge from the better armed and disciplined knights of Santiago, at a place known still today as Desbarato ("Rout"), near Santa Catarina da Fonte do Bispo. Correia however did not pursue because he suspected of a feigned retreat, a tactic commonly employed by Muslim warriors. The next day, the Santiago rear, where Correia rode, was attacked near a river crossing at Almargem, and forced to seek refuge at a hill still known today as Cabeço do Mestre ("Hill of the Master") until nightfall, at which point they were able to resume their march back to Cacela.

=== The conquest of Tavira ===
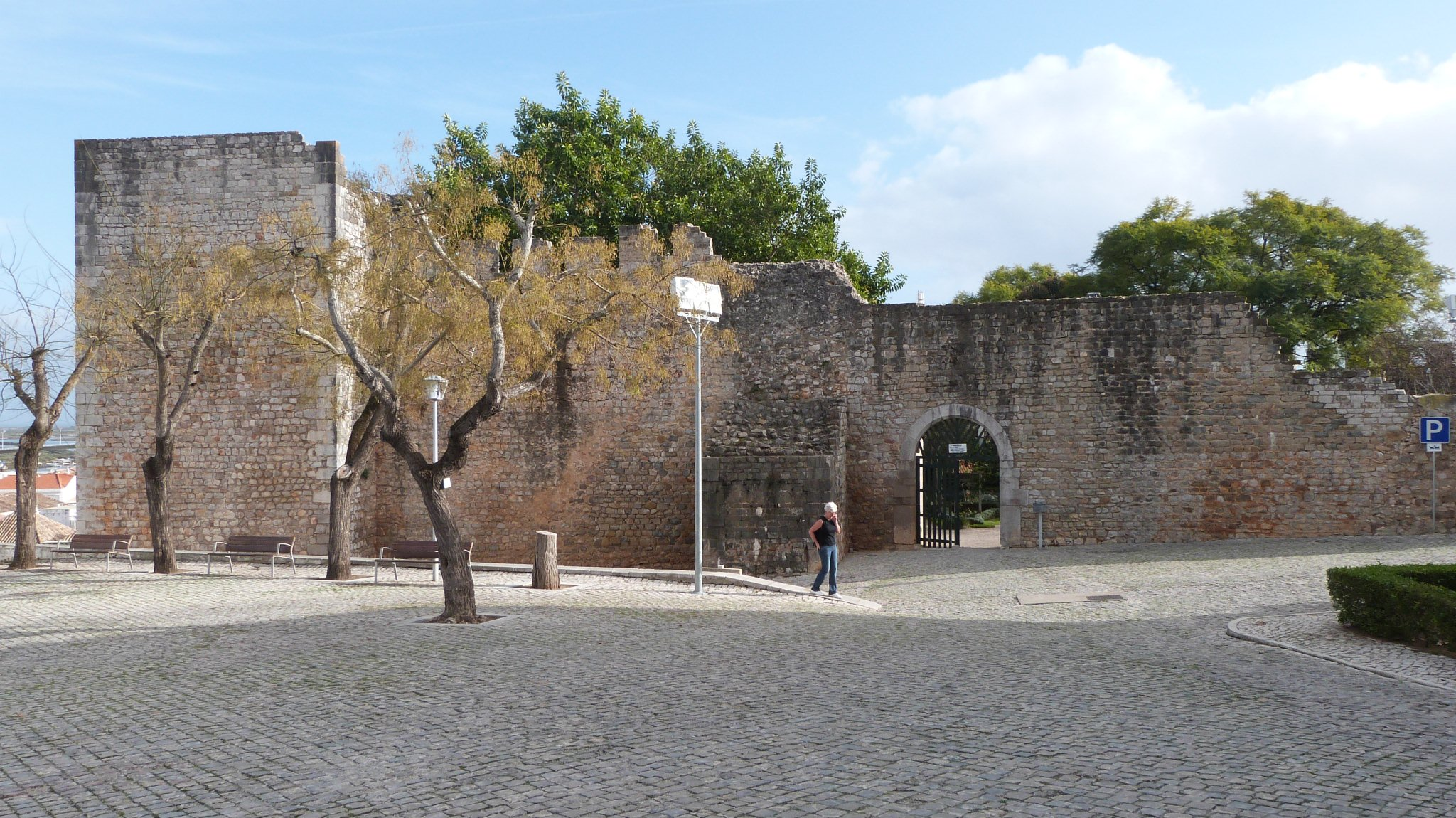
The castle of Tavira

Having failed to decisively defeat the Christians on an open field engagement, the Muslims instead proposed a truce for the summer months so as to resume their harvest and pick fruit at peace, which Correia accepted so he could in turn replenish his forces and recruit more men.

Despite the truce, Garcia Rodrigues and six other knights were unexpectedly massacred at Antas, in the modern-day parish of Luz de Tavira, by the garrison of Tavira, which felt provoked when the Christians crossed into the city territory to hunt fowl. Informed of the case at nearby Cacela, Correia gathered his men and defeated the garrison of Tavira while it was still at Antas, and successfully pursued them as far as the city gates, which were breached through the rear gate Porta da Traição, before the Muslims had had time to organize an effective defense. Thus one of, if not the most important settlements in eastern Algarve unexpectedly fell on the hands of the Order.

=== The conquest of Salir, Silves and Paderne ===
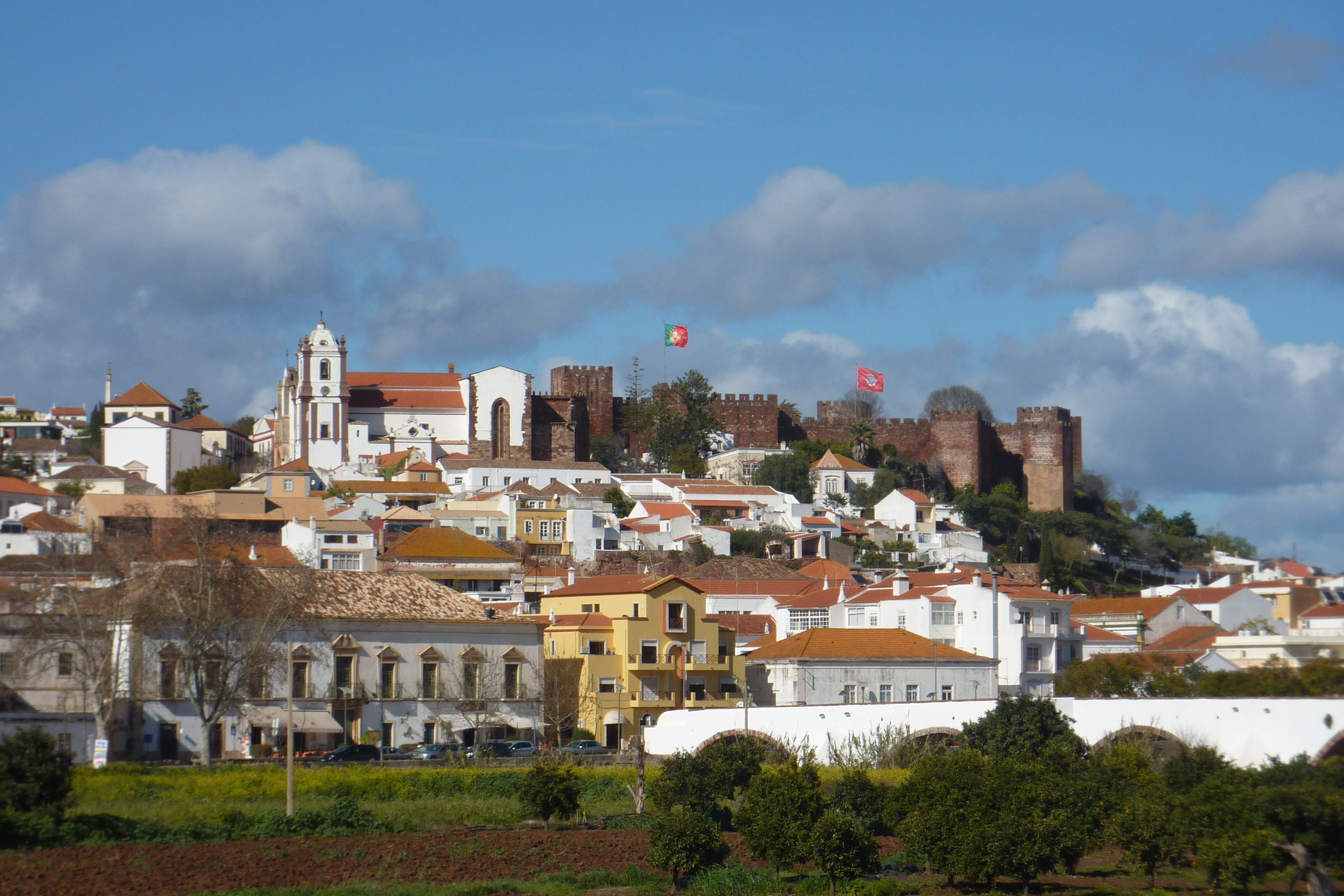
City and citadel of Silves

With Tavira in the hands of the Order, the castle of Salir followed. This fortification was located along one of the few roads that crossed Algarve east to west and also provided access to Alentejo to the north.

Paio Peres then sought to capture Silves, where Ibn Mahfuz was lodged at: a ruse was employed for this purpose, whereby he put into circulation the rumour that he was about to set siege to Estômbar with a large number of men; he then dispatched a small detachment to attack that castle and when he received the news that Ibn Mahfuz had left Silves with most of his forces, he attacked the city and scaled its walls. Most of the inhabitants withdrew to the upper citadel and put up resistance to the knights of Santiago when Ibn Mahfuz returned with his army. The Muslims then engaged the Christians on the walls which connected the city to the nearby river, but, lacking the means to retake the settlement, Ibn Mahfuz withdrew. He would live for twenty more years, although a local tradition maintained that he drowned in a nearby ford. The citadel was breached along a few points and it surrendered after Correia offered its last fighters a favourable deal. The crafty conquest of Silves was the tactical master-piece of Correia during his campaign in Algarve.

Paderne was scaled and taken by storm a few days later and its garrison massacred as a reprisal for having killed two knights. The mountain fortresses of Monchique, Montagudo, Marachique, Ourique and Messines are likely to have surrendered not long afterwards.

=== The conquest of Faro, Loulé, Aljezur, Porches and Albufeira, 1249 ===
The flag of Dom Afonso III

After Paio Peres Correia returned to Castile, the cities of Aljezur, Faro, Loulé, Porches and Albufeira still remained in Muslim hands, however they had declared vassalage to the Marinids of Morocco and were hard to take without the support of a fleet.

Pope Gregory IX issued the papal bull Cum Clarissimus in 1241 so as to pressure king Sancho II to subdue these final Muslim strongholds, however the Portuguese king found himself involved in conflict with the Church and rebellious nobles led by his brother Afonso III and could not undertake any new campaigns to the south.

Once Afonso III emerged victorious from the civil-war that pitted himself against his brother in 1248, he prepared a new campaign in the Algarve so as to seal his authority as king before the Portuguese nobility, to reward loyal followers and to fulfill a vow he had made to Pope Innocent IV in 1245 should he ascend to the throne. Yet Portugal was debilitated by the chaotic reign of Sancho II and civil-war. Nevertheless, circumstances encouraged Afonso to move against Algarve in view of his vows to the Church as well as the fast advance that Ferdinand III was making in neighbouring Castile. The time for campaign was opportune as in neighbouring Castile Ferdinand III had recently captured Valencia, Córdoba, Seville and threatened many more cities in Andalusia.

After touring the country gathering support and granting privileges, Afonso III settled in Lisbon in 1248. Early in the following year, the king moved through Estremadura as by then he had already decided to embark on a campaign in the south. He recruited men from among the urban militias and extracted scutage from those who did not wish to fight, in cities as far as Porto. Though the military Orders gave Afonso full support, the barons or the clergy seem to have abstained from helping in the campaign. Certain notable men had helped Ferdinand III in the taking of Seville before returning to Portugal, among them the grand-master of Santiago Paio Peres Correia and prince Pedro, uncle of king Afonso, but still a great number were absent.

In the early weeks of March 1249, Afonso III crossed the mountain ranges on the border of Algarve with his army through Almodôvar. He was accompanied by his main supporters during the civil-war, headed by Dom João de Aboim, as well as the masters of the military Orders, namely the grand-master of Calatrava Dom Lourenço Afonso and grand-master Paio Peres Correia, who was in turn accompanied by the commander of Mértola Gonçalo Peres Magro.

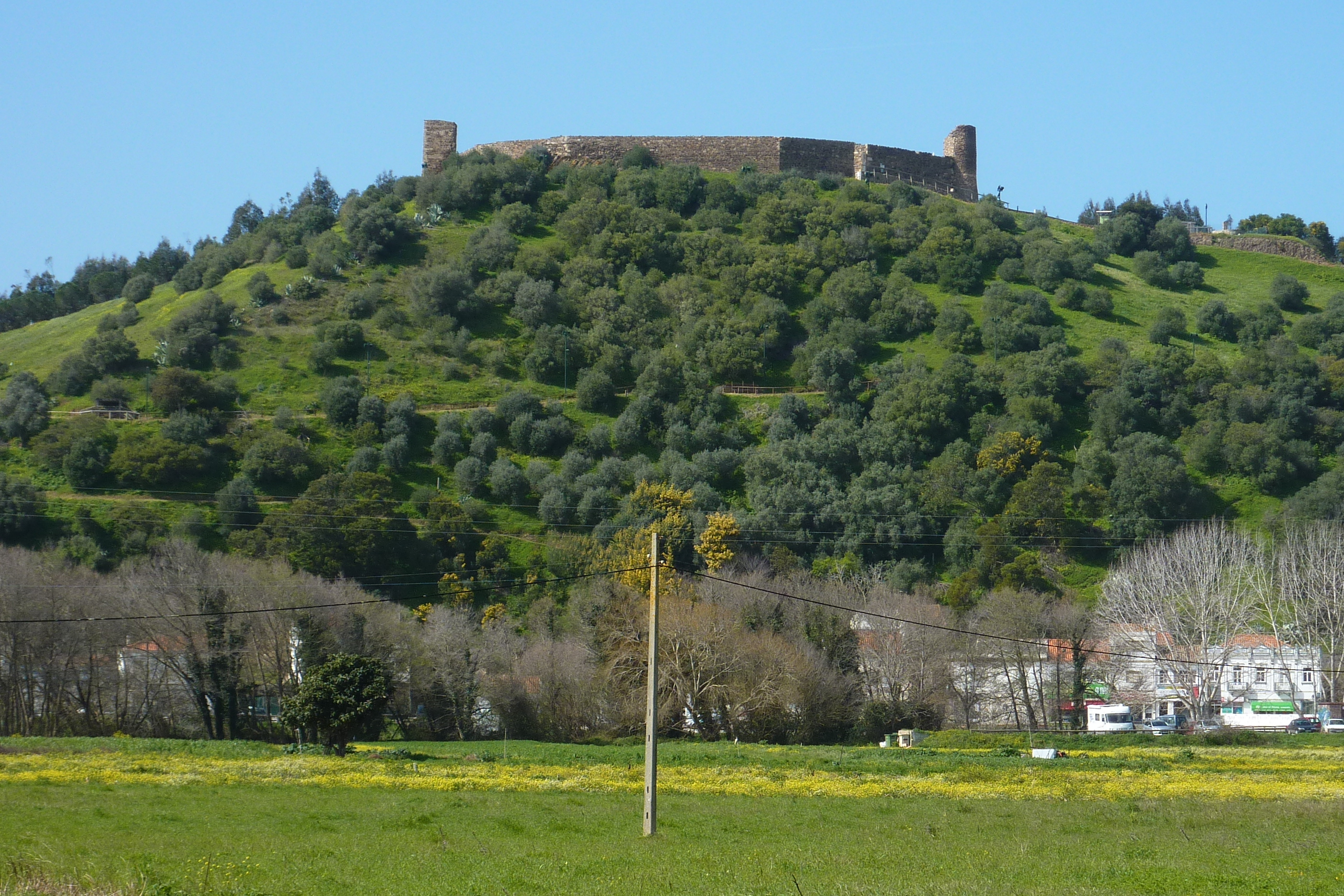
The castle of Aljezur

The important port city of Faro was besieged first. Its qaid Alboambre put up spirited resistance hoping for reinforcements from Morocco, until the Portuguese fleet sailed up the river. With the harbour blocked, the city delivered its keys to the Portuguese king, thus avoiding pointless bloodshed and securing a favourable agreement for its residents under Portuguese authority.

Loulé surrendered after little resistance. Porches and Albufeira surrendered to the grand-master of Calatrava Dom Lourenço Afonso. Aljezur, the last Muslim stronghold in Algarve, was taken by Paio Peres Correia.

== Aftermath ==
Through an effective and intelligent use of limited resources, Paio Peres Correia not only avoided the difficulties associated with the crossing of mountain ranges or the capture of mountain fortresses, but captured most of the Algarve without ever facing the costs of lengthy and expensive sieges, which the Order could not bear, instead resorting to raid warfare, ruses and surprise lightning attacks.

Afonso III completed the conquest of Algarve and retook the title of "King of Portugal and Algarve", created by Sancho sixty years prior when he captured the city of Silves.

Although the kings of Portugal had claimed the Algarve, Ibn Mahfuz had declared himself a vassal of Ferdinand III of Castile, who considered that the territory was rightfully his as a result. This caused a diplomatic dispute between Portugal and Castile that was only definitively resolved with the signing of the Treaty of Badajoz in 1267, in which the rights of Afonso III were recognized and the Portuguese-Castilian border fixed on the Guadiana river.

== See also ==
- Military history of Portugal
- Siege of Lisbon
- Al-Andalus
