= Castle of Tavira =

Castle in Tavira, Portugal

Coordinates: 37.1252°N 7.6513°W

- Castelo de Tavira
- Tavira, Algarve, Portugal
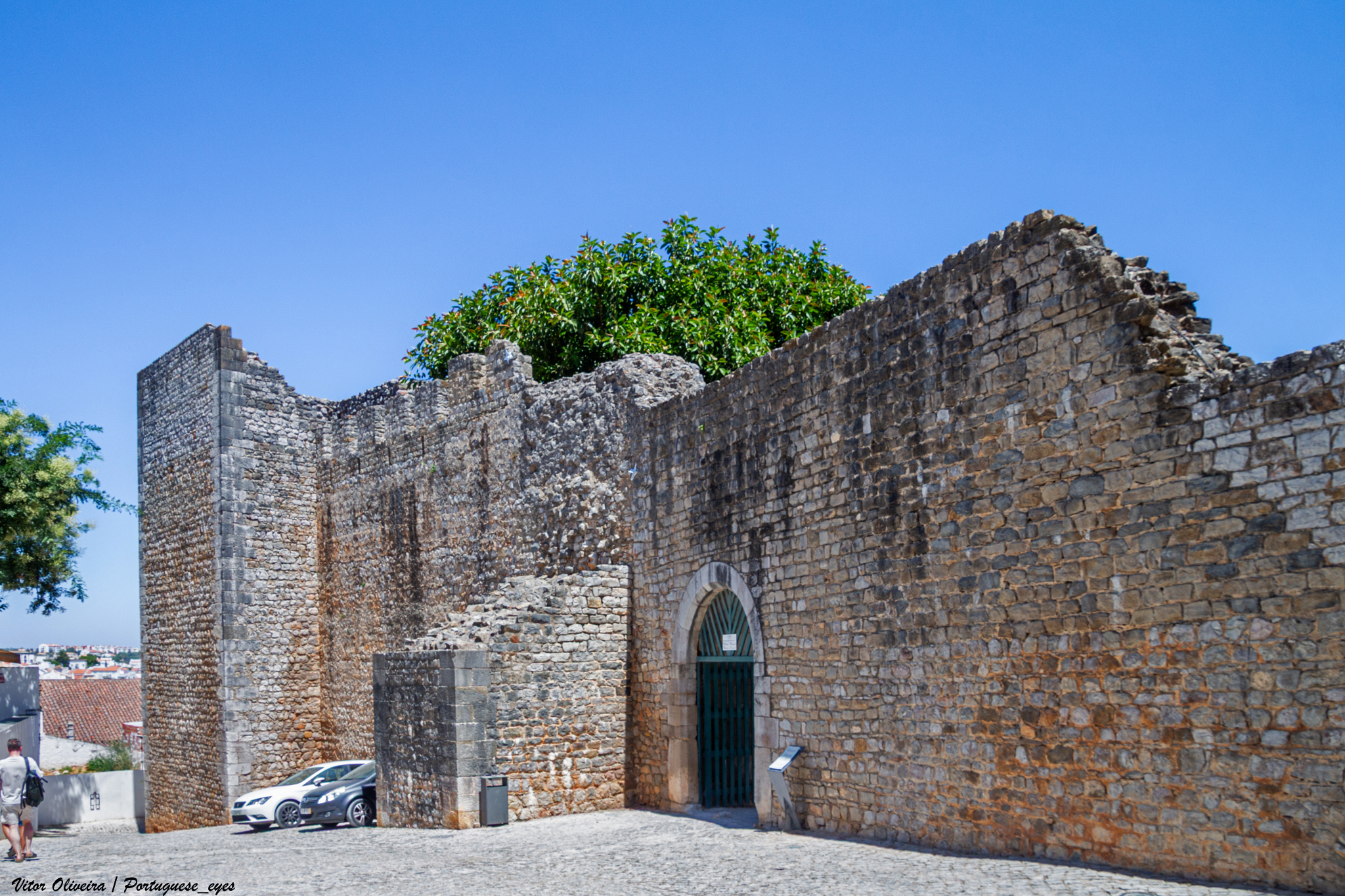

Site information
- Type: Castle
- Open to the public: Yes

The Castle of Tavira (Portuguese: Castelo de Tavira) is a medieval castle located in the parish of Santiago, Tavira municipality, Faro district of Portugal. In a dominant position over the mouth of the river Gilão, the settlement has developed as an important sea port since antiquity, with its predecessors dating back to the 8th century BC, passing through the hands of Phoenicians, Greeks, Celts, Carthaginians, Romans, Moors and the Portuguese crown.

== History ==
=== Early history ===
Although the early human occupation of the region dates back to prehistoric times, an archaeological campaign undertaken in 1997 revealed a Phoenician wall of section dating from the eighth century BC. This colony of sailors and traders was the first proof of establishment.

When the Romans invaded the Iberian Peninsula, the village, then called Balsa, acquired strategic importance due to the presence of a bridge over the river.

The town later came under the control of the Moors in their conquest of the region.

=== Medieval era ===
At the time of the Christian reconquest of the peninsula, Portuguese forces reached the eastern Algarve from 1238. Tavira was conquered on 11 June 1239 (May 1240, according to Alexandre Herculano or even 1242 according to other sources), by the forces under the command of D. Paio Peres Correia, Master of the Order of Santiago. Tradition associates this achievement with a reprisal by that Order for the death of seven of its knights in an ambush while hunting on the site of Antas, in the current parish of Luz.

On 9 January 1242 (or 1244 according to other sources), Sancho II of Portugal (1223–1248) donated the domains of Tavira and the patronage of his church to the Order of Santiago, a donation confirmed in 1245 by Pope Innocent IV.

Pretending that the city had been conquered by a Castilian Military Order, Alfonso X of Castile claimed it for himself, coming to impose siege and conquer it in 1252. The following year, a treaty was signed by which Alfonso III of Portugal (1248–1279) would marry Afonso X's daughter and, if that union resulted in a son who would turn seven, his maternal grandfather would give him the gift of the Algarve. Since the conditions of this legislation were fulfilled in 1264, Afonso X delivered the Algarve to Afonso III by letter of 20 September, set in Seville. Because of this act, the Portuguese sovereign granted foral letters to various Algarvian villages, the first of which Tavira in August 1266.

Under the reign of King Dinis (1279–1325), the castle was repaired and reinforced and the village fence expanded around the year 1292. The sovereign, by Royal Letter of 15 April 1303, extended the privileges of the residents, preventing their property from being seized or sold except for debts with the Crown.

At the time of the 1383-1385 succession crisis, the Master of Avis, future John I of Portugal (1385–1433) donated Reguengo de Tavira to Fernão Álvares Pereira, brother of Constable Nuno Álvares Pereira. Later, after the conquest of Ceuta, started the process of the Portuguese Discoveries, the village would see its strategic and economic importance increase. The castle, however, showed risk of collapse, according to the complaint of its people before the courts of 1475.

Under the reign of Manuel I of Portugal (1495–1521), the village received the "Foral Novo" (1504), raising it to city status on 16 March 1520, among other important privileges. Vasco Eanes Corte-Real was the Alcaide-mor at the time.

In 1573, when King Sebastian (1568–1578) visit Tavira, construction work on the Santo Antonio Fort (Forte do Rato), in front of the Gilão river bar in 1577, was in progress.

=== 18th century to modern day ===
Later, in the context of the Portuguese Restoration War, John VI of Portugal (1640–1656) confirmed all the privileges granted to Tavira by his predecessors, determining works to modernize the medieval castle, reinforcing its structure and adapting it to the shots of the then modern artillery. The defense of the village was complemented, in 1672, by the beginning of the construction of the São João da Barra de Tavira Fortress, in Gomeira, bordering the Gilão river in 1717.

In the 18th century, the castle's structure was severely damaged by the 1755 Lisbon earthquake, which certainly contributed to the fact that, in the following centuries, the defensive perimeter of the settlement was dismantled to a great extent.

The Tavira Castle walls are classified as a National Monument by decree published on 16 May 1939.

== Architecture ==
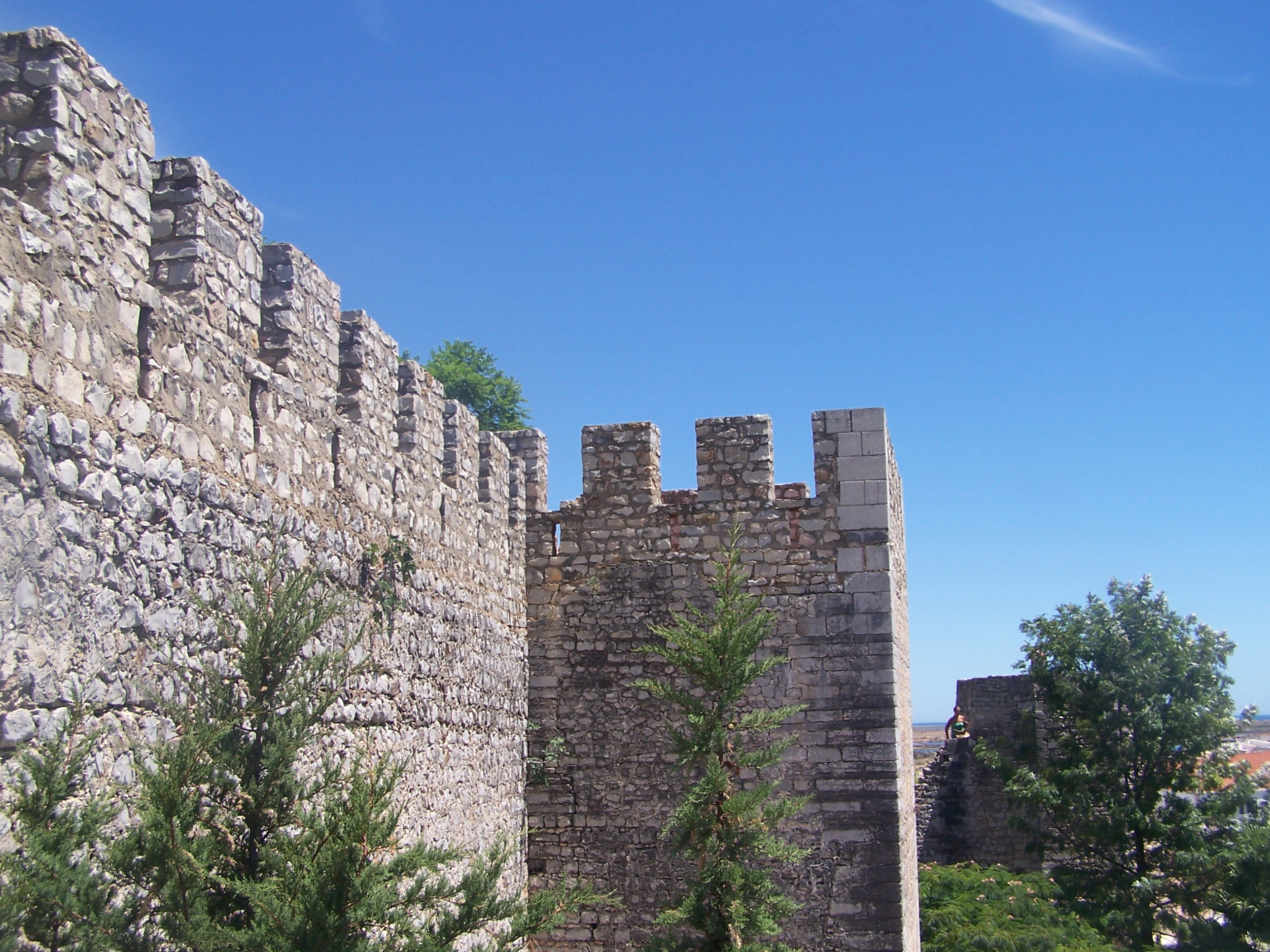
A section of the castle walls

The walls of Tavira show various construction stages, the oldest of which dating back to the Almoravid period in the late eleventh century or early twelfth century. Although difficult to identify, it is believed to have been integrated by an alcove in the southeast angle and by a walled enclosure oriented in the north–south direction, both of modest dimensions.

This initial structure was reformed in the Almohad period, when it acquired the main elements that have survived to the present day, from which remains of rammed-earth walls survive. In the area of the current Praça da República, next to the Overseas National Bank building, an old horseshoe arch door was found, associated, in its origin, with a defensive tower. In the area of the current alcáçova, an albarrã tower still remains, multifaceted and facing south, detached from the other structures.

From the conquest by the Christians, a new constructive stage took place, giving it the oval plant still identifiable today, which, in the Low Middle Ages, reached about five hectares, a considerable surface for the time and which attests to the importance of the settlement. From this period, interventions carried out under the reigns of D. Afonso III and Denis of Portugal are noteworthy, believed to date from the latter the remains identified in the grounds of Pensão Castelo, as well as the original configuration of the D. Manuel Gate, in a broken arch still in Gothic style. In the passage to the Modern Age, this door became the main axis of passage between the interior and exterior of the walls, which is why the arms of this sovereign are inscribed on it. The fence then had 7 doors: Fernão Mendes, Mouraria, Postigo, Feição, Vila Fria, D. Manuel and Porta Nova.

== Legends ==
=== The legends of the Moorish castle of Tavira ===
Local tradition states that, in the castle, there is an enchanted Moorish who, every year, on the night of Saint John's Eve, appears to mourn his destiny. She would be the daughter of Aben-Fabila, the Moorish governor who, when Tavira was conquered by Christians, disappeared by magic arts, after enchanting her daughter. It is said that he intended to return to regain the city and thus rescue his daughter, but he never succeeded.

Another legend reports a great passion of a Christian knight, Don Ramiro, for the enchanted Moorish. One night in Saint John's Eve, when the knight saw the Mooress crying in the battlements of the castle, he was impressed both by its beauty and by the unhappiness of its condition. Lost in love, he decided to climb the castle walls to disenchant her. The task, however, proved to be difficult, and the knight took so long to climb that the dawn broke, thus passing the time to break the spell. At that moment, the Moorish woman entered, in tears, the cloud that hovered above the castle, while D. Ramiro watched without being able to do anything. The knight's frustration was such that from then on he engaged with great fervor in the struggles against the Moors, having even conquered a castle, but without another Moorish to love.

=== Hunting ===
It is said that, during a truce between Christians and Moors, six Christian knights went hunting in the dolmen site, near Tavira, and were killed by the Moors. Their names were D. Pedro Pires (Peres or Rodrigues, commander of the Order of Santiago de Castela), Mem do Vale, Durão (or Damião) Vaz, Álvoro (Álvaro) Garcia (or Garcia Estevam), Estêvão (Estevam) Vaz ( Vasques), Beltrão de Caia and another Jewish merchant named Garcia Roiz (or Rodrigues). Cristóvão Rodrigues Acenheiro gives the names of these six knights as being: D. Pedro Paes, Men do Valle, Duram Vaz, Alvaro Garcia, Estevam Vaz and Boceiro de Coja. In retaliation for these deaths, configuring the breaking of the truce, is that the Christians would have promoted the conquest of Tavira.

Another episode, also legendary, refers to this primitive legend: at the time of Afonso IV of Portugal (1325–1357), around 1328, Afonso XI of Castile imposed a siege on Tavira. On that occasion, the Castilian forces "... having set up camp in the Church of São Francisco. On a Saturday morning and when choosing the best place to attack the walls, he saw on the Church of Santa Maria seven huge figures with flags in their hands and on them the arms of the apostle Santiago. Amazed he called the councilors who told him that these figures were the seven knights who died when Tavira was conquered by the Moors and who were the guardians of the city. The king, knowing this and out of devotion to the martyred knights, soon went to his kingdom without doing any harm in Portugal. " (Brother João de São José).
