= Pego do Inferno =

Pego do Inferno Waterfall and lake
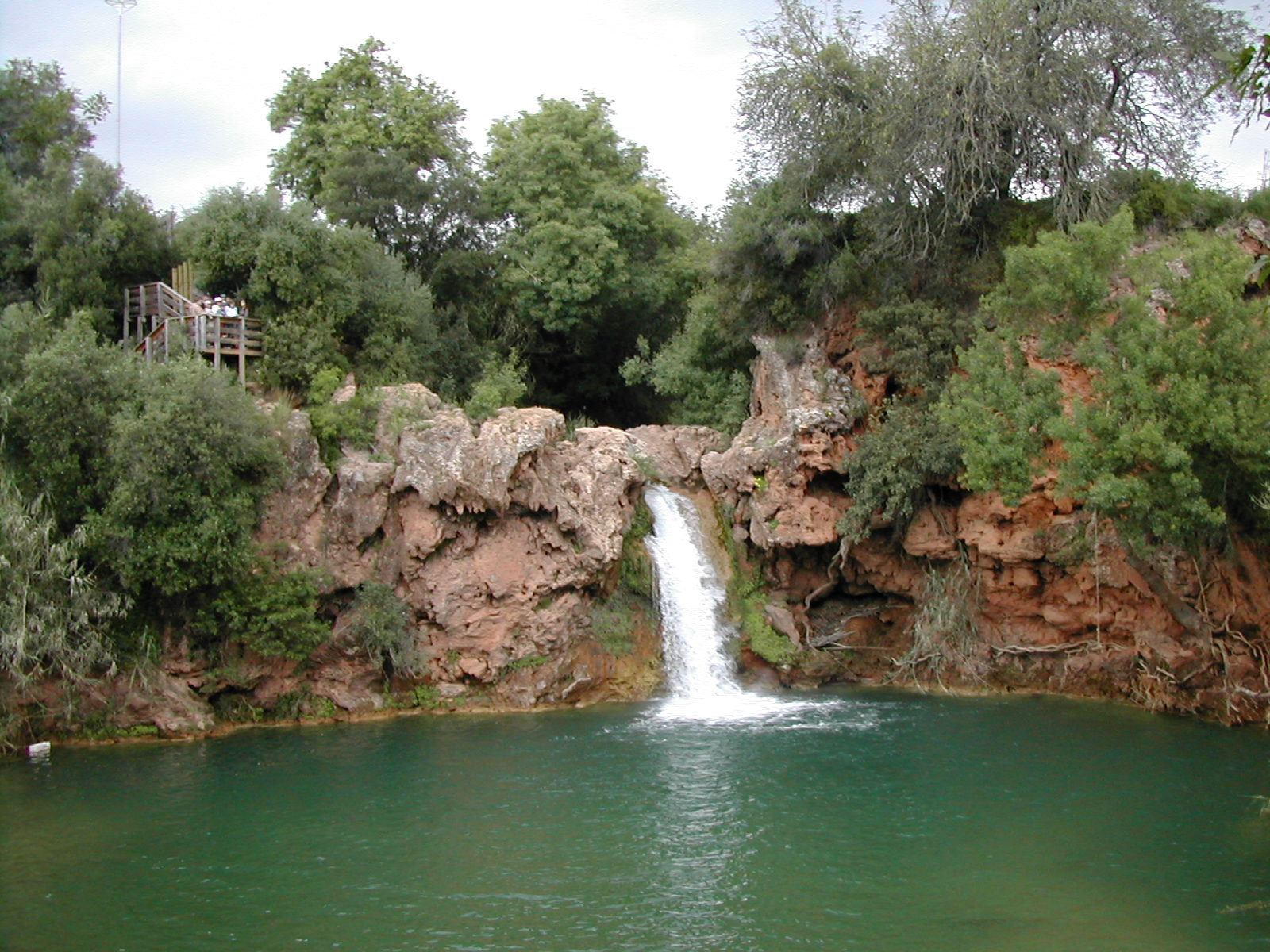
- Pego do Inferno Waterfall and lake

- Location within Portugal
- Location: Tavira, Portugal
- Coordinates: 37°09′19.5″N 7°41′45.9″W
- Watercourse: Asseca stream

Pego do Inferno is a small waterfall and lake located in the parish of Santo Estêvão, in Tavira in the Algarve, Portugal. It is one of the three waterfalls formed by Asseca stream.

== History ==
It was known among locals as the "secret waterfall". Now known as Pego do Inferno (Hell's Pool/Pit of hell) due to a popular local legend about the site about a carriage that fell into the lake and was never found. It was said that anyone who fell into it would go straight to hell.

The legend also says that the bodies of the occupants of the cart and the animals were never found and that divers were not able to find the bottom of the lake, which has been called (Hell's Pool/Pit of hell) ever since.

Barriers and bins, were installed in 2000, as well as a small café.

A fire closed the area in 2012. Since then, the municipality of Tavira has not reopened the space to the public and the facilities have been abandoned. However, every summer, vacationers and locals still visit the small waterfall.

== See also ==
- List of waterfalls
