= Luz de Tavira =

- Civil parish
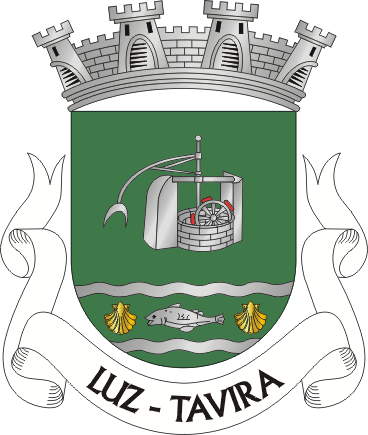
- Coat of arms

- Location in Portugal
- Coordinates: 37°05′N 7°43′W
- Country: Portugal
- Region: Algarve
- Intermunic. comm.: Algarve
- District: Faro
- Municipality: Tavira
- Disbanded: 2013

Area
  - Total: 31.53 km^{2} (12.17 sq mi)

Population (2001)
  - Total: 3,778
  - Density: 119.8/km^{2} (310.3/sq mi)
- Time zone: UTC+00:00 (WET)
  - Summer (DST): UTC+01:00 (WEST)

Luz de Tavira is a former civil parish in the municipality of Tavira, Portugal. In 2013, the parish merged into the new parish Luz de Tavira e Santo Estêvão.
