= Luz de Tavira e Santo Estêvão =

- Civil parish
- Location in Portugal
- Coordinates: 37.093°N 7.703°W
- Country: Portugal
- Region: Algarve
- Intermunic. comm.: Algarve
- District: Faro
- Municipality: Tavira

Area
  - Total: 59.91 km^{2} (23.13 sq mi)

Population (2011)
  - Total: 4,535
  - Density: 75.70/km^{2} (196.1/sq mi)
- Time zone: UTC+00:00 (WET)
  - Summer (DST): UTC+01:00 (WEST)

Luz de Tavira e Santo Estêvão is a civil parish in the municipality of Tavira, Portugal. It was formed in 2013 by the merger of the former parishes Luz de Tavira and Santo Estêvão. The population in 2011 was 4,535, in an area of 59.91 km².
