= Cachopo =

- Civil parish
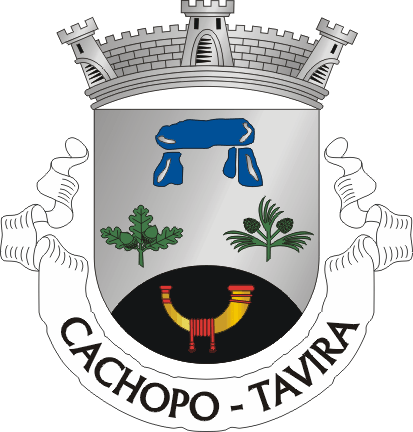
- Coat of arms

- Location in Portugal
- Coordinates: 37.333°N 7.817°W
- Country: Portugal
- Region: Algarve
- Intermunic. comm.: Algarve
- District: Faro
- Municipality: Tavira

Area
  - Total: 203.53 km^{2} (78.58 sq mi)

Population (2011)
  - Total: 716
  - Density: 3.52/km^{2} (9.11/sq mi)
- Time zone: UTC+00:00 (WET)
  - Summer (DST): UTC+01:00 (WEST)

Cachopo is a freguesia (parish) in the municipality of Tavira (Algarve, Portugal). The population in 2011 was 716, in an area of 203.53 km^{2}.
