= Santo Estêvão (Tavira) =

- Civil parish
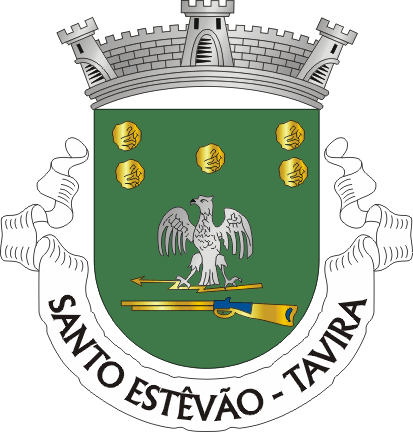
- Coat of arms

- Location in Portugal
- Coordinates: 37°07′N 7°42′W
- Country: Portugal
- Region: Algarve
- Intermunic. comm.: Algarve
- District: Faro
- Municipality: Tavira
- Disbanded: 2013

Area
  - Total: 26.36 km^{2} (10.18 sq mi)

Population (2001)
  - Total: 1,287
  - Density: 48.82/km^{2} (126.5/sq mi)
- Time zone: UTC+00:00 (WET)
  - Summer (DST): UTC+01:00 (WEST)

Santo Estêvão is a former civil parish in the municipality of Tavira, Portugal. In 2013, the parish merged into the new parish Luz de Tavira e Santo Estêvão.
