= Gilão River =

River in southern Portugal

Gilão River Rio Gilão
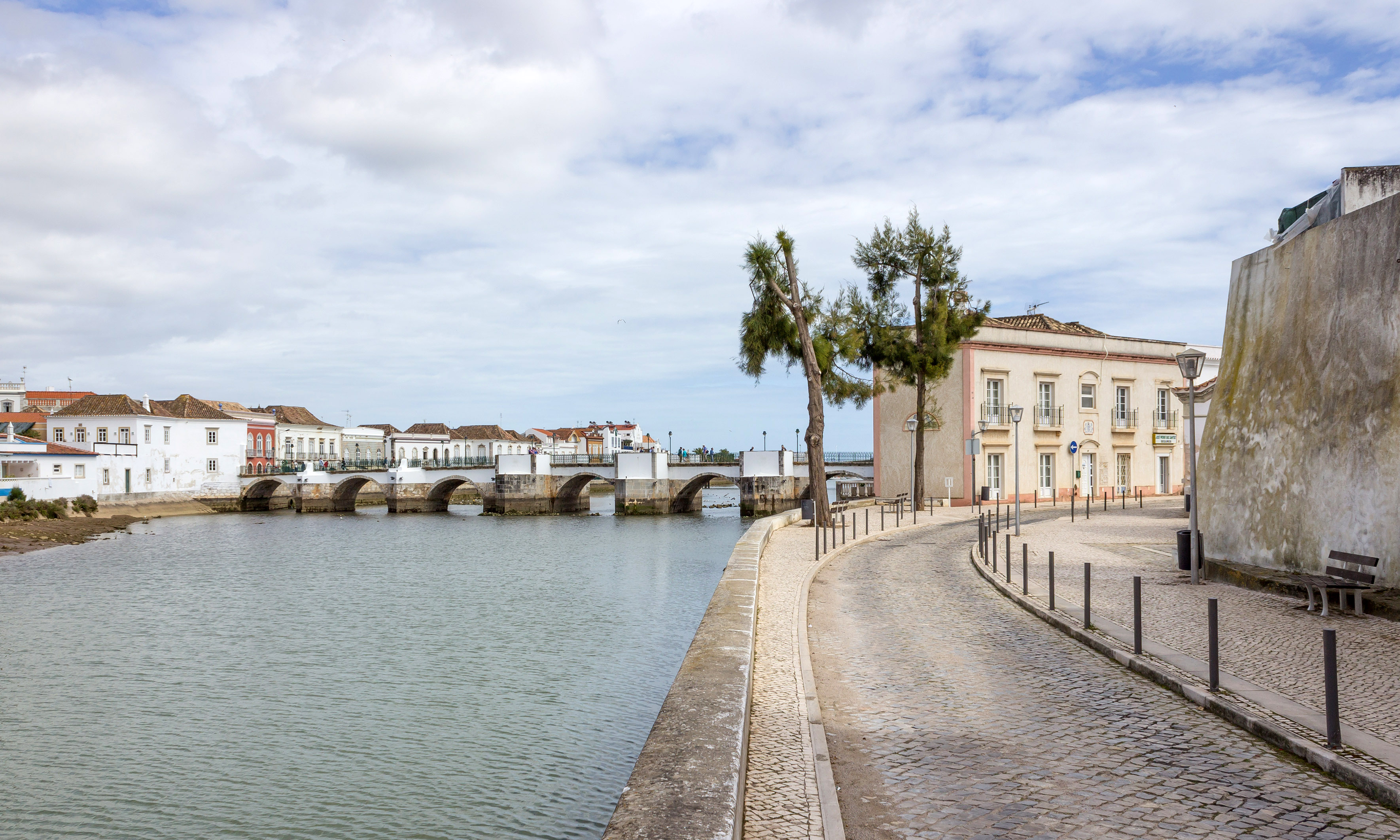
- The River Gilão in the area around Tavira, Portugal

Location
- Country: Portugal

Physical characteristics
- Mouth
  - coordinates: 37.126381°N 7.648544°W

The Gilão (Portuguese pronunciation: [ʒiˈlɐ̃w]) is a river in southern Portugal. It is approachable from the Atlantic Ocean, where it enters at the town of Tavira in the Algarve, 35 kilometres (22 mi) east of Faro. The river Gilão changes its name to Rio Séqua at the ancient bridge named Ponte Romana in the centre of Tavira. The river's source is located in the Serra do Caldeirão mountains of the central Algarve, at the confluence of the Asseca, Zimbral and Alportel rivers, the latter rising north of São Brás de Alportel. From here it flows in a southeasterly direction and passes through the Ria Formosa national park south of Tavira, eventually meeting the Atlantic Ocean between the barrier islands of Tavira and Cabanas.

The channel is clear, but a bit meandering. There is a large tide swing of about 3 metres (9 ft) feet. There are extensive mariculture clam beds and salt pans near the sea. The name Gilão comes from Gil with doubtful origin but it sounds like the Old Norse word gill meaning stream.
