= Józef Karol Konrad Chełmicki =

Polish-born Portuguese general

Józef Karol Konrad Chełmicki (Portuguese: Jose Carlos Conrado Chelmicki) (born 19 February 1814 in Warsaw; died 28 June 1890 in Tavira) was a Polish-born Portuguese general.

== Early life ==
As a young cadet Chełmicki participated in the November Uprising (1830–31). After the insurrection started, he volunteered to fight. He took part in numerous battles and skirmishes, and after the capitulation, in 1832, he emigrated to France.

While in Paris he attended military courses and lectures at Sorbonne, studying engineering and drawing, and he also studied several languages at the École royale de langues orientales, all with the aim of participating in an expedition to Egypt.

== Military life in Portugal ==
Since the expedition to Egypt was canceled he then decided to participate in the Portuguese Liberal Wars, joining the Dona Maria Polish Legion. Chełmicki appeared in Porto, to which Dom Miguel was laying siege, and was accepted as second lieutenant to an engineering unit.

After the Liberal Wars, Chełmicki also served Queen Christina of Spain in the Carlist Wars, where he was made Knight of the Order of Isabella the Catholic.

After the fighting ceased, he remained in the Portuguese army, serving in Elvas – a stronghold located close to the Spanish border – then in colonial holdings in Africa, on Cape Verde Islands, and then in continental Portugal again – in Portalegre and Algarve, gradually making his way to the function of brigade general in 1876 and to the division general in the same year. At that time, he discharged responsible functions of the Evora military district commander. After 55 years of service, he retired in 1888.

== Family life ==
Chełmicki married Júlia Hofacker von Moser, daughter of Georg Christoph Heinrich von Moser, consul of Baden-Württemberg in Lisbon, in Portugal, in 1844, at Mártires, and they had five children.

One of his sons, also named Józef Chełmicki, was a major in the Portuguese army, and died in 1931.

After his wife's death, he married Carlota de Melo Pereira in Algarve. From this marriage he had no children.

== Works ==
Chełmicki was a writer, and he left a few valuable works in Portuguese, the most famous of them the two-volume description of the Cape Verde Islands and Portuguese Guinea. The book, co-authored with Francisco Adolfo de Varnhagen, Viscount of Porto Seguro, titled Corografia Cabo-Verdiana and published in Lisbon in 1841, is valued to this day as one of the earliest depictions of those areas; it includes extensive data about plants and animals. It is illustrated by lithography tables with images of fish and birds based on drawings made by the author, whose name on the title page is "Jose Conrado Carlos de Chelmicki, tenente do Corpo de Engenheiros".

In 1852 Filipe Folque, the leading nineteenth century Portuguese cartographer and head of the Portugal’s map-making Department from 1848 to 1874, was promoted to Head of the General Office of Geodesic, Topography and Cadastral Works. Due to the lack of experienced engravers in Portugal he hired, in France, the Polish lithographer Jan Nepomucen Lewicki and made him responsible for the drawing and lithography of the maps. Chełmicki took part in the team led by Lewicki and produced some of the most important Portuguese cartography works of that period.

In 1841, Chełmicki was commissioned by the Portuguese Government to author a book on the famous Lisbon aqueduct and at the end of his military career, he published his major works on the issue of Portuguese defense system. He was co-founder of the science-oriented military magazine entitled "Revista Militar", which exists up to this day, and author of numerous publications.

Despite his strong relationship to his new home country of Portugal, Józef Chełmicki did not lose contact with the Polish emigration in France. He authored a very diligently prepared list of books and manuscripts which he encountered in the former Royal Library in Lisbon.

== Death and honors ==
Józef Chełmicki died in Tavira, Portugal, on 28 June 1890. In 2006 the city of Tavira honored Józef Chełmicki naming a street after him.

== Other Polish military in Portugal ==
Polish military men of all ranks, up to generals, fought for Belgium, France, Spain, Hungary and Turkey. Some of them reached Portugal, where they fought and were decorated for achievements. They did this, however, for their own reasons, on their own initiative, and using ways which remain unknown. Before 1939, colonel Ferreira Lima, Portuguese historian and expert on Polish–Portuguese relations, researched the participation of Polish soldiers in the civil war between Dom Pedro and Dom Miguel, and managed to mention 25 Polish military men, who fought under the banner of Queen Mary. Some of them included:

- Jan Józef Urbański, who reached the rank of lieutenant-colonel and was awarded the Torre e Espada order, the highest military decoration in Portugal.
- Franciszek Michałowski, known to have left Portuguese service during the Revolutions of 1848.
- Alojzy Rola-Dzierżawski, also a colonel, distinguished with the Order of Cavalier’s Cross of Christ, who died in 1851.
- Norbert Rudzki, who became prominent in Angola in 1854. One hundred years later, in a place where he landed, the memorial chapel was built to celebrate his merits as the founder of Porto Alexandre.

In 1936, in Vila Nova de Gaia, the brave poles that defended the City of Oporto, during the Portuguese Liberal Wars, in the battle of "Serra do Pilar", were honored with a street being named after them: "Rua dos Polacos".

== Medals and decorations ==
- Knight (CavTE) of the Military Order of the Tower and Sword, of Valour, Loyalty and Merit (Portuguese: Ordem Militar da Torre e Espada do Valor, Lealdade e Mérito), the pinnacle of the Portuguese honours system.
- Knight of the Military Order of Christ (Portugal), former Knights Templar order in Portugal
- Knight of the Order of Isabella the Catholic.

== List of published works ==
- Chelmicki, José Carlos Conrado de; Varnhagen, Francisco Adolfo de (1841). Corografia caboverdiana ou descrição geográfico-histórica da província das Ilhas de Cabo Verde e Guiné (in Portuguese). Lisbon: Typ. de L. C. da Cunha.
- Chelmicki, José Carlos Conrado de (1878). Esboço sobre a defeza de Portugal (in Portuguese). Lisbon: Typ. Lallemant Fréres.
- Chelmicki, José Carlos Conrado - “Relatório Sobre o Traçado de um Caminho de Ferro pela Beira” in Boletim do Ministério das Obras Públicas Comércio e Indústria, nº 1, Janeiro, 1860, Lisboa, Imprensa Nacional, 1860, pp. 71–74;
- Chelmicki, José Carlos Conrado de (2008). Memoria sobre o Aqueducto Geral de Lisboa feita por ordem do Ministerio das Obras Publicas em portaria de 15 de Fevereiro de 1856 (in Portuguese). Lisbon: EPAL - Empresa Portuguesa das Águas Livres. p. 44. ISBN 9789899576100.

== Bibliography ==
- Wielka Encyklopedia PWN, tom 5, str. 354, Warszawa 2003
- Polski Słownik Biograficzny, t. III, Polska Akademia Nauk, Kraków 1937
- Grande Enciclopedia Portuguesa e Brasileira, Lisboa – Rio de Janeiro, volume VI, p. 651-652.
