= Santa Catarina da Fonte do Bispo =

- Civil parish
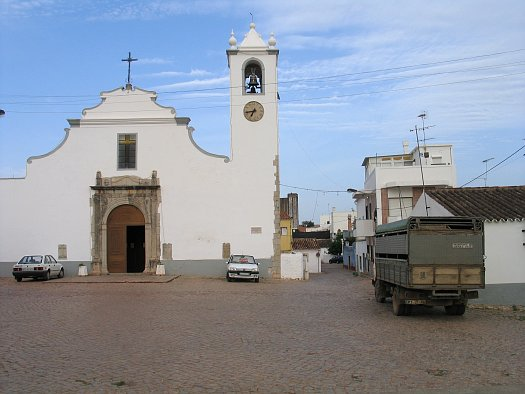
- The parish centre, with the parochial church of Santa Catarina

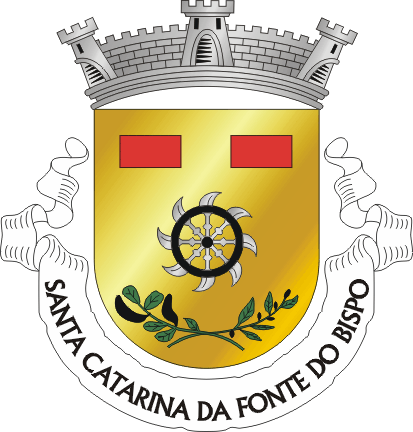
- Coat of arms

- Location in Portugal
- Coordinates: 37.154°N 7.789°W
- Country: Portugal
- Region: Algarve
- Intermunic. comm.: Algarve
- District: Faro
- Municipality: Tavira

Area
  - Total: 118.98 km^{2} (45.94 sq mi)

Population (2021)
  - Total: 1,873
  - Density: 15.74/km^{2} (40.77/sq mi)
- Time zone: UTC+00:00 (WET)
  - Summer (DST): UTC+01:00 (WEST)
- Postal code: 8800
- Area code: 281
- Patron: Santa Catarina

Santa Catarina da Fonte do Bispo is a civil parish in the municipality of Tavira, in the Portuguese Algarve. The population in 2021 was 1,873, in an area of 118.98 km^{2}.

== History ==
Santa Catarina lies midway between the important Roman port town of Santa Luzia da Tavira (named as Balsa in Roman times) and the Roman settlement of Sao Bras de Alportel.

The oldest record from this region, the Cartório Notarial de Tavira (of 10 April 1601) identified the organized settlement of Santa Catarina. The church was erected sometime in the 15th century, and complements the style of the parochial church of the Misericórdia in Tavira, which itself was built at the end of the first half of that century. It is assumed that the parish was established sometime prior to the erection of the church. The oldest ecclesiastical records, the births, baptisms, marriages and deaths recorded from this parish correspond to evident from the Torre do Tombo, and situate the parish around 1632.

Fonte do Bispo was a toponymic name referenced as early as the 14th century. The parish was named from Saint Catherine of Alexandria, who perished in 307 AD, referring to a legend stating that an image of Catherine appeared at the fountain of the bishop (Portuguese: Fonte do Bispo): this gave rise to the regions name.

Created from the ecclesiastical parish in 1835, this local authority's records were lost prior to 1886.

== Economy ==
The main economic activities of this parish are the production of olive oil, the ceramics industry (manufacture of tiles, tiles and bricks), rural tourism and distilleries (mainly medronho brandy)

The conversion of the into a digital arts center is planned for 2026.

== Geography ==
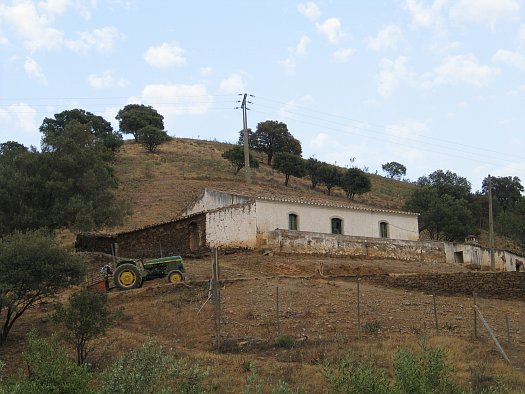
The typical rural farmhouse in the mountains of the Barrocal

Santa Catarina is a small agglomeration of homes, situated on the edge of the Tavira-Loulé roadway (the Estrada Nacional E.N. 270), approximately 11 kilometres (6.8 mi) from the urban centre of Tavira. The famous Fonte do Bispo is located some distance from this road, along the rocky cliffs.

The parish, is intimately associated with the region's soils. The southern part of the parish, south of the EN 270, is based in limestone, characterized by superficial deposits that extend from the sub-soils. To the north, and parallel the limestone areas, is a narrow strip of red sandstone, known as the grés de Silves, locally referred to as arneiro or pedra amoladeira. To the north of this zone is a mountainous schist zone, with heavily carved valleys and rounded ridges.

The limestone formation is named the Barrocal, and is occupied by orchards, olive trees, almond trees, figs and vineyards, in addition to the cultivation of cereal crops and legumes. The red sandstone grés de Silves has also been used by locals for planting orchards, irrigated by rainwater collected from the slopes of the ridges. The ridge, including areas of the Barrocal and Arneiro, are alluvial zones; the mountains around these areas produce wheat, barley, vineyards and olive orchards.

The Barrocal and Arneiro are zones of disperse settlements, homes isolated from one another, while in the mountain regions, the land is broken by more dense groupings of settlements. Consequently, a toponymic reference to sites (Portuguese: sítios) and mountain (Portuguese: montes) settlements prevail. A sítio is a determine area of the territory with disperse habitat, while the montes is a mountain-top locality, independent of the number of dwellings, but relying on its influence.

== Local Festivals and Events ==
August 3rd. Saturday & Sunday - Vigil of Our Lady of Sorrows Catholics are invited to contemplate the seven sorrows of the Blessed Virgin Mary.

August 25 - Santa Catarina Fair - in 1813, the Santacatarinenses asked the Príncipe Regente for authorization to hold an annual fair in order, with the income of the respective territory, to increase the celebration that they already offered to Nossa Senhora das Dores (Our Lady of Sorrows). It is held over 4 days around the 25th. of the month.

November 11 - Saint Martin's Day - marks the arrival of winter, associated with men, the celebration of the maturation of the new wine, and roasted horse chestnuts. It is celebrated traditionally around a bonfire, and drinking a local light alcoholic beverage called água-pé, or the stronger jeropiga.

November 25 - Saint Catherine's Day - also marks the arrival of winter, associated with women. On the following Sunday a church procession around the village takes place in the afternoon.

Market Day - 4th. Sunday of every month.

== Climate ==
Santa Catarina da Fonte do Bispo has a hot-summer Mediterranean climate with hot, dry summers and mild, wet winters. Its location lies between the Algarvian Barrocal, an inland, higher altitude karstic region, and serra towards the coast, making its winters slightly cooler and summers hotter than those experienced on the coast. Precipitation is also higher, with December being the wettest month.

Climate data for Santa Catarina da Fonte do Bispo, altitude: 250 m (820 ft), extremes 1980-2001
Month	Jan	Feb	Mar	Apr	May	Jun	Jul	Aug	Sep	Oct	Nov	Dec	Year
Record high °C (°F)	22.0 (71.6)	22.0 (71.6)	27.0 (80.6)	27.0 (80.6)	32.0 (89.6)	36.0 (96.8)	41.0 (105.8)	40.0 (104.0)	38.9 (102.0)	31.0 (87.8)	26.0 (78.8)	20.5 (68.9)	41.0 (105.8)
Mean daily maximum °C (°F)	14.5 (58.1)	15.6 (60.1)	17.7 (63.9)	18.7 (65.7)	22.6 (72.7)	28.0 (82.4)	31.7 (89.1)	31.3 (88.3)	27.8 (82.0)	22.8 (73.0)	18.1 (64.6)	15.4 (59.7)	22.0 (71.6)
Daily mean °C (°F)	10.4 (50.7)	11.1 (52.0)	13.3 (55.9)	14.5 (58.1)	17.6 (63.7)	21.5 (70.7)	24.7 (76.5)	24.8 (76.6)	21.8 (71.2)	17.8 (64.0)	13.8 (56.8)	11.4 (52.5)	16.9 (62.4)
Mean daily minimum °C (°F)	6.3 (43.3)	6.6 (43.9)	8.9 (48.0)	10.3 (50.5)	12.6 (54.7)	15.0 (59.0)	17.7 (63.9)	18.3 (64.9)	15.8 (60.4)	12.8 (55.0)	9.5 (49.1)	7.4 (45.3)	11.8 (53.2)
Record low °C (°F)	0.3 (32.5)	0.1 (32.2)	−4.5 (23.9)	3.0 (37.4)	4.0 (39.2)	7.4 (45.3)	10.2 (50.4)	11.0 (51.8)	7.5 (45.5)	4.5 (40.1)	1.0 (33.8)	0.8 (33.4)	−4.5 (23.9)
Average precipitation mm (inches)	91.3 (3.59)	71.4 (2.81)	57.8 (2.28)	64.6 (2.54)	40.5 (1.59)	10.2 (0.40)	3.6 (0.14)	4.3 (0.17)	30.8 (1.21)	88.2 (3.47)	107.4 (4.23)	162.4 (6.39)	732.5 (28.82)
Average relative humidity (%)	78	77	74	67	62	53	47	52	66	74	76	80	67
Source: Portuguese Environment Agency

For Soil Moisture Index, Santa Catarina da Fonte do Bispo is covered by The Portuguese Institute for Sea and Atmosphere, (IPMA).

== Art & Culture ==
- Museu Zer0, the former village grain silo, has been transformed into a Digital Arts Centre, supported by funding from the Portuguese Government. It will be the only dedicated digital arts centre in Western Europe. Planned to open in Santa Catarina in 2025, Museu Zer0 is already presenting digital arts activities throughout Algarve, and will have space for exhibitions, electronic music concerts, workshops, conferences and artistic residencies, among other projects related with digital art.

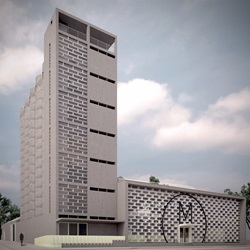
Museu Zer0, The Digital Arts Center, Santa Catarina da Fonte do Bispo

== Architecture ==
- Market of Santa Catarina de Fonte do Bispo (Portuguese: Mercado de Santa Catarina de Fonte do Bispo), the Estado Novo-era market, was built in the nationalist style, by the architect Helbling for the Direcção dos Edifícios do Sul;
