= Santa Luzia (Tavira) =

- Civil parish
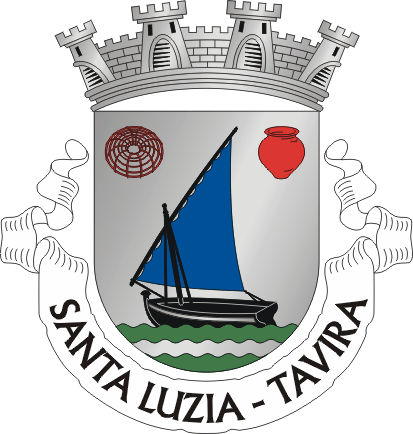
- Coat of arms

- Location in Portugal
- Coordinates: 37.101°N 7.661°W
- Country: Portugal
- Region: Algarve
- Intermunic. comm.: Algarve
- District: Faro
- Municipality: Tavira

Area
  - Total: 8.50 km^{2} (3.28 sq mi)

Population (2011)
  - Total: 1,455
  - Density: 171/km^{2} (443/sq mi)
- Time zone: UTC+00:00 (WET)
  - Summer (DST): UTC+01:00 (WEST)

Santa Luzia is a freguesia (parish) in the municipality of Tavira (Algarve, Portugal). The population in 2011 was 1,455, in an area of 8.50 km^{2}. It is considered the "capital do Polvo" or "capital of octopus" which is a local speciality.

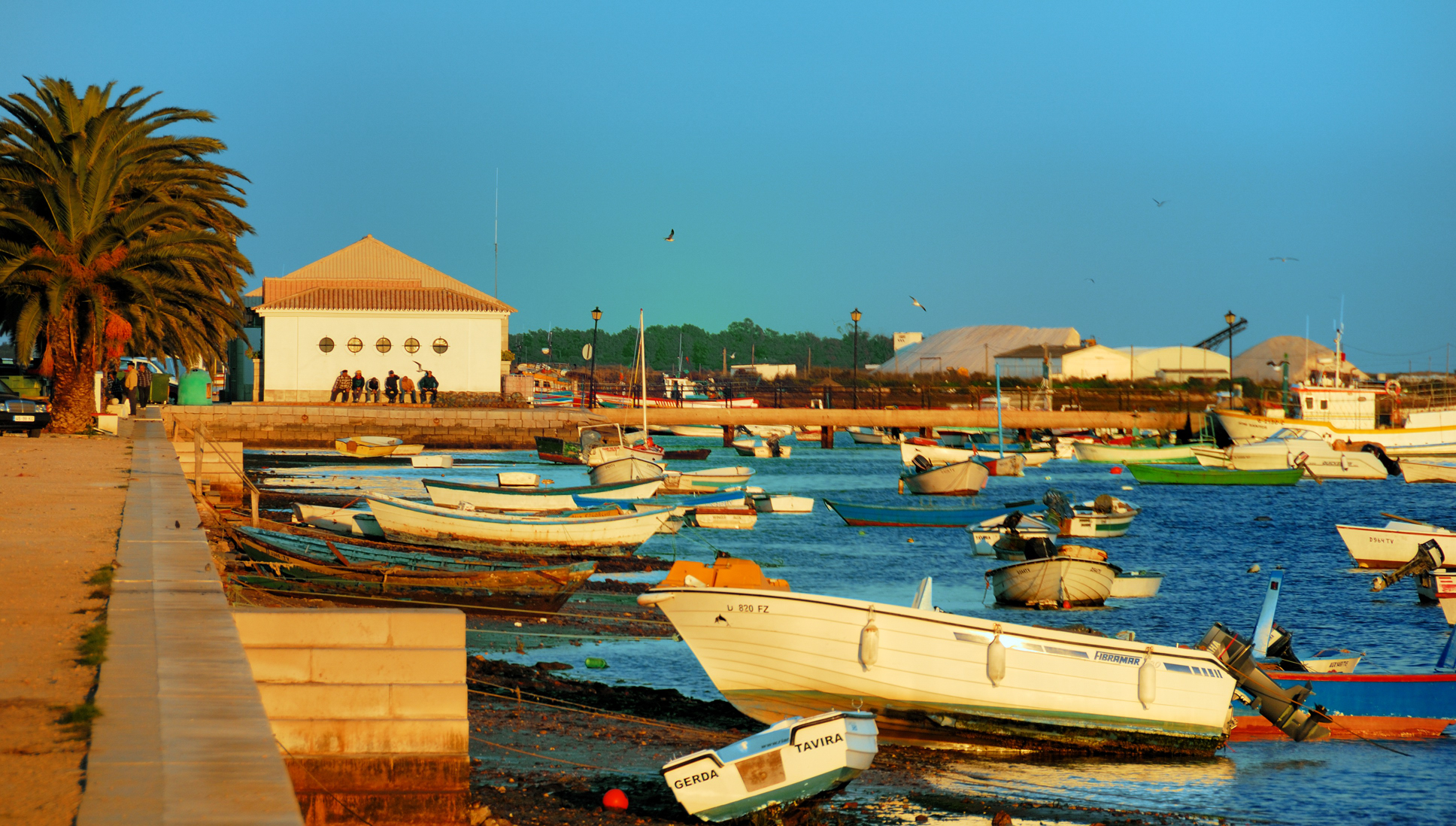
A View of the harbour in Santa Luzia facing east
