= Senhora do Verde =

Village in Portugal

Coordinates: 37°13′N 8°35′W

Senhora do Verde is a small village near Mexilhoeira Grande, Portugal.
