= Tavira Island =

Landmass off the coast of Tavira, Portugal

Native name: Ilha de Tavira
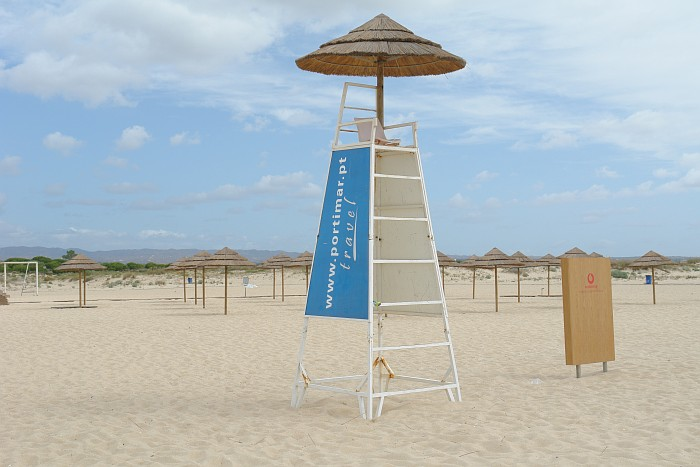
- Beach on the island
- Interactive map of Tavira Island

Geography
- Location: Atlantic Ocean
- Coordinates: 37.087°N 7.666°W

Administration
- Portugal
- Algarve

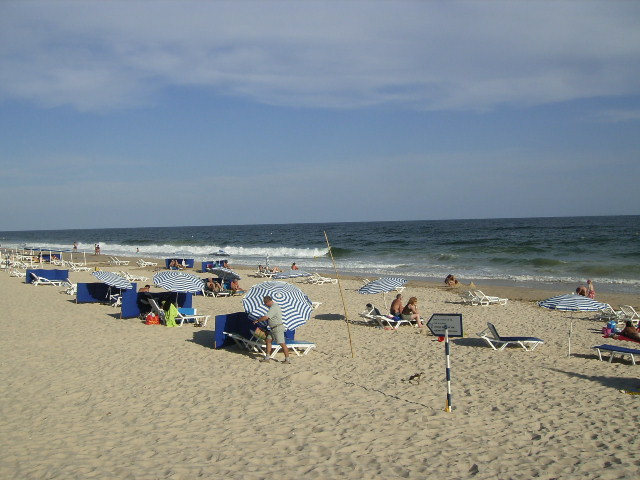
Beach do Barril

Tavira Island (Portuguese: Ilha de Tavira) lies south of the town of Tavira, Portugal, just a few hundred metres off the coast. It is 11 kilometres long and varies between 150 m to 1 km in width. The island has 11 km of the best beaches in the Algarve, including areas where naturism can be legally practised. It is part of the Natural reserve of Ria Formosa. It is also popular among tourists, people that like to swim and bird watchers.

== History ==
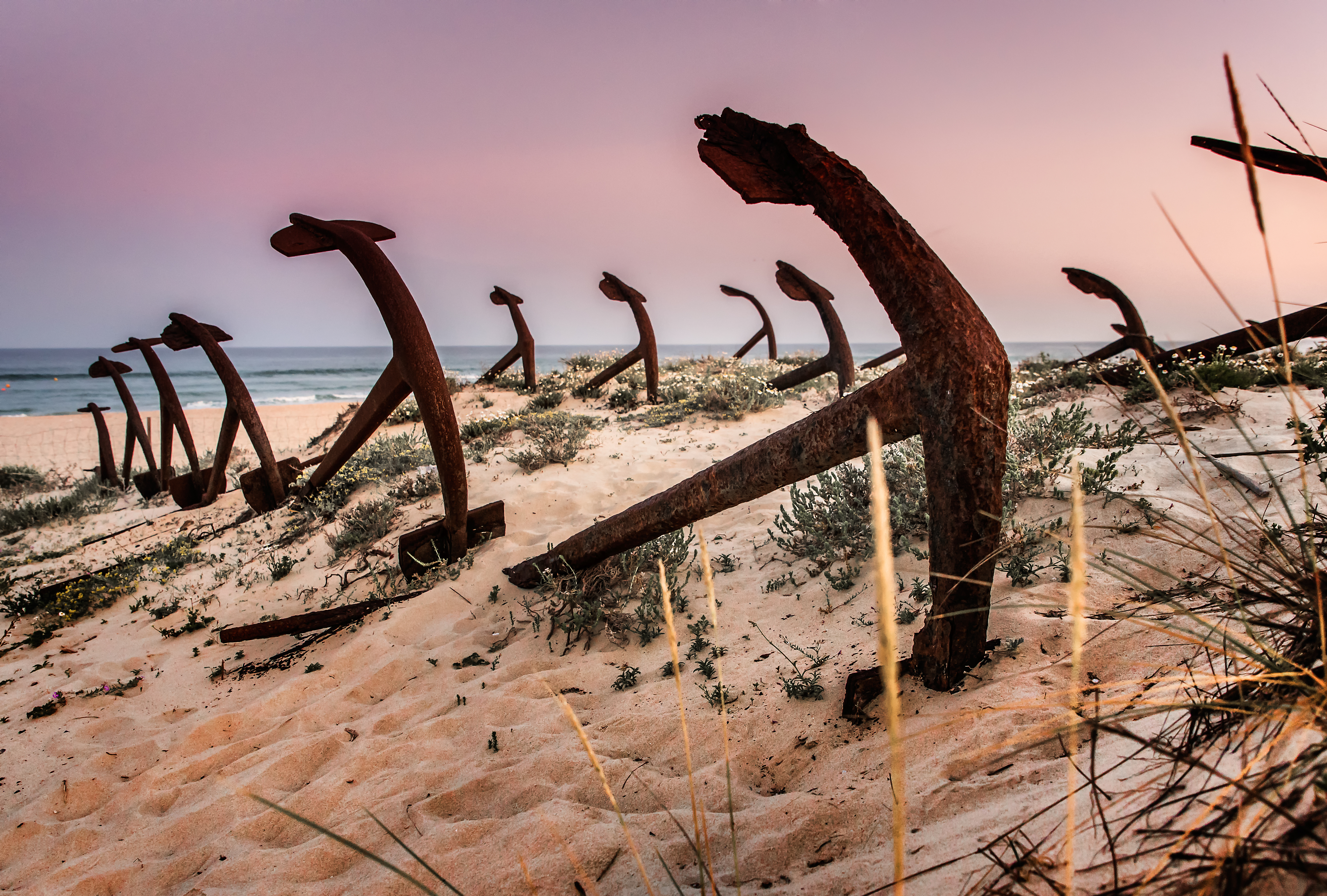
Graveyard of Anchors on Tavira island

The island was home to a thriving tuna industry using the old Phoenician technique called Almadrava, between 1841 and 1967, on Barril beach, where approximately 80 families lived. During the 1960s the tuna numbers declined, the migration patterns of tuna changed and fishing for tuna was abandoned, as well as the canning factories in the area. Sometime after 1966 the anchors used in the Almadrava technique were lined up on the island as a monument to the old tuna fishing industry. A train was used to transport the large tuna to the mainland from the island which has been converted to transport tourists. The old fisherman's houses are now used as shops and restaurants.

== Access ==
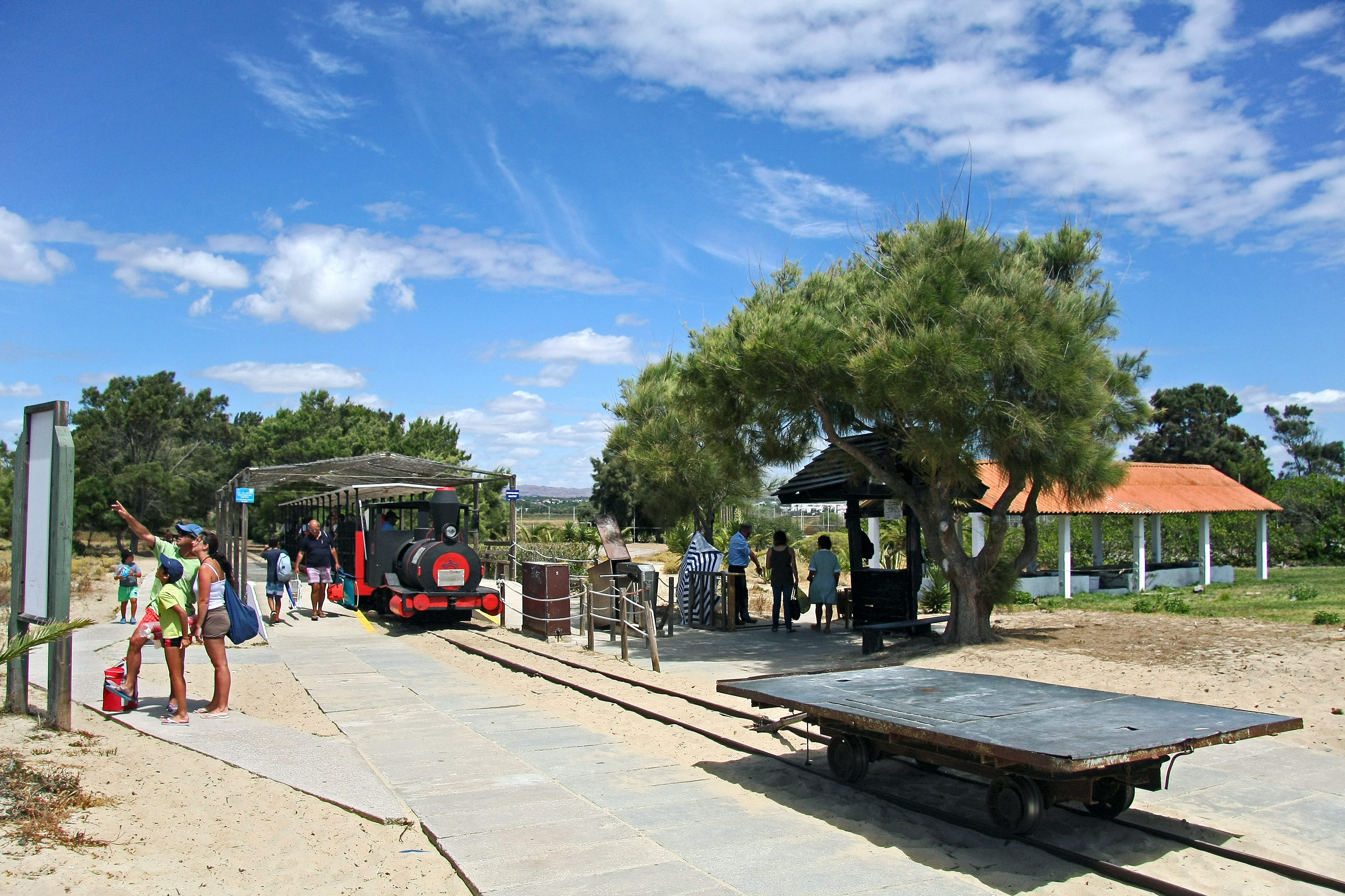
Tourist train to Tavira island

Access to the island is by ferry or water taxi from Quatro Águas, southeast of Tavira, and also by a small floating bridge in the Santa Luzia / Pedras d'El Rei area, followed by a small train trip (operating during the summer months) or on foot, via a footpath parallel to the railway line (c. 2 km).
