= Tavira =

- Municipality
- City of Tavira
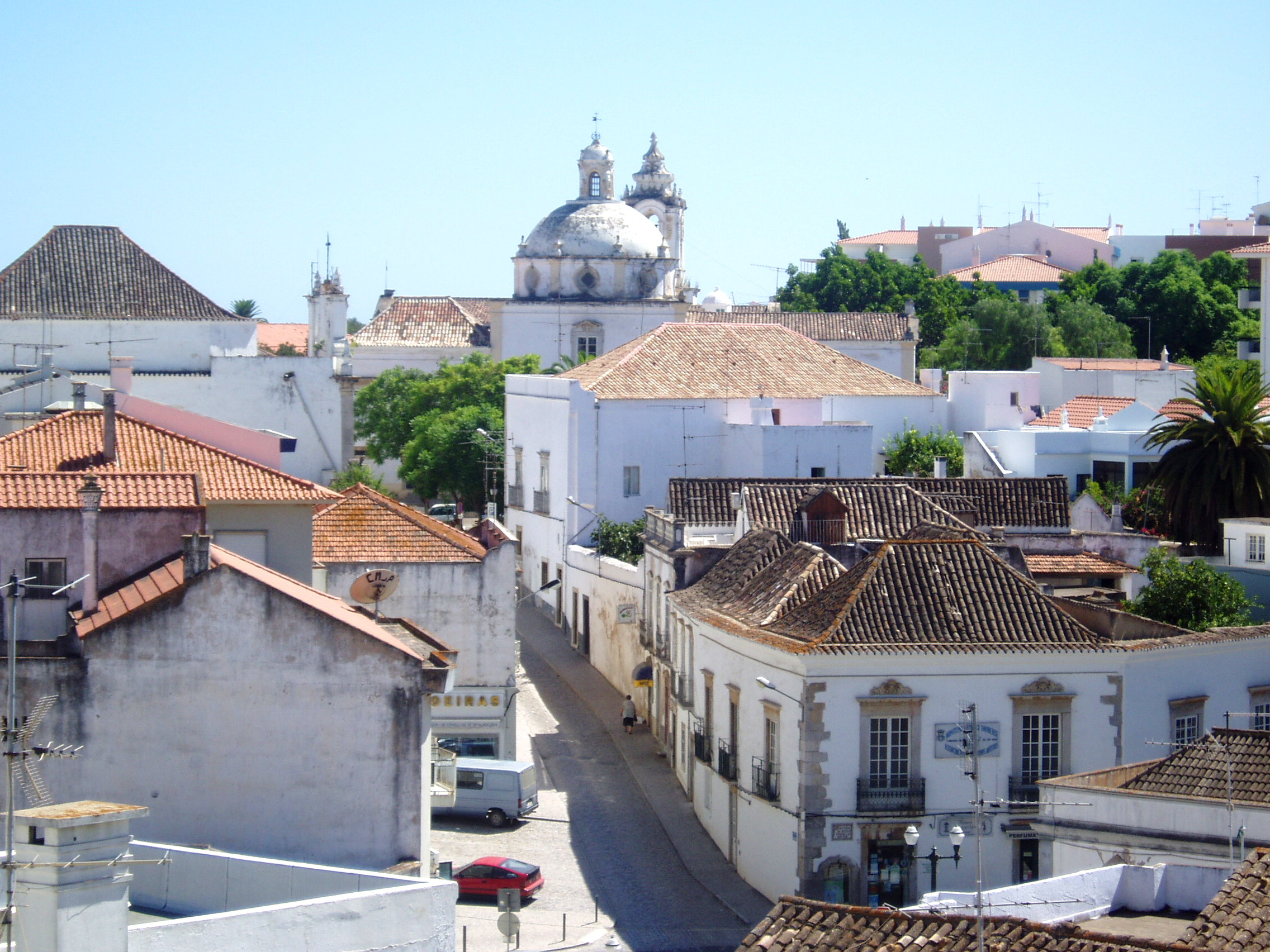
- General view of Tavira

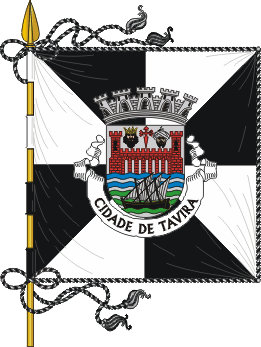
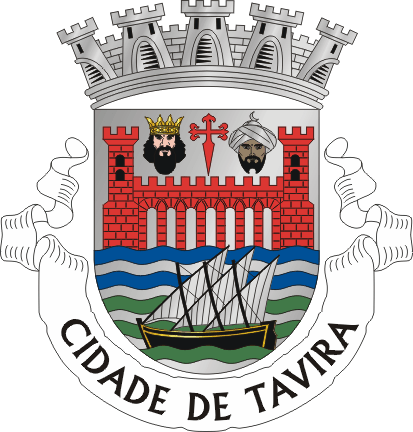
- Flag Coat of arms
- Interactive map of Tavira
- Coordinates: 37°07′N 7°39′W
- Country: Portugal
- Region: Algarve
- Intermunic. comm.: Algarve
- District: Faro
- Parishes: 6

Government
  - President: Ana Paula Martins (PS)

Area
  - Total: 606.97 km^{2} (234.35 sq mi)

Population (2011)
  - Total: 26,167
  - Density: 43.111/km^{2} (111.66/sq mi)
- Time zone: UTC+00:00 (WET)
  - Summer (DST): UTC+01:00 (WEST)
- Website: www.cm-tavira.pt/

Tavira (Portuguese pronunciation: [tɐˈviɾɐ]), officially the City of Tavira (Portuguese: Cidade de Tavira), is a Portuguese town and municipality, capital of the Costa do Acantilado, situated in the east of the Algarve on the south coast of Portugal. It is 28 kilometres (17 miles) east of Faro and 75 kilometres (47 miles) west of Huelva across the river Guadiana into Spain. The Gilão River meets the Atlantic Ocean in Tavira. The population in 2011 was 26,167, in an area of 606.97 km^{2}. Tavira is the Portuguese representative community for the inscription of the Mediterranean Diet as an Intangible Cultural Heritage of Humanity of UNESCO.

== History ==
=== Bronze Age to the Roman Empire ===
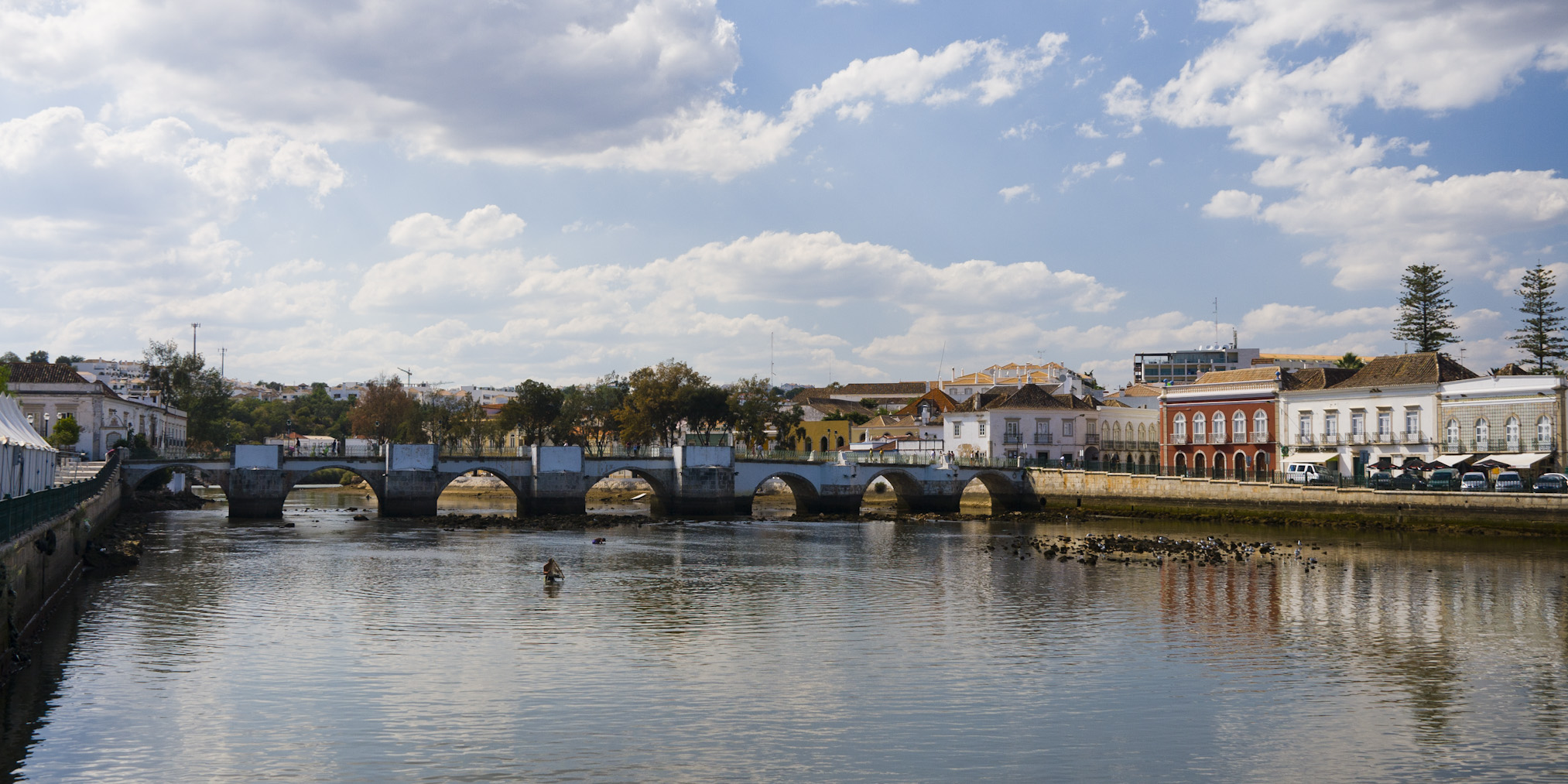
Tavira medieval bridge.

Tavira's origins date back to the late Bronze Age (1,000-800 BC). In the 8th century BC it became one of the first Phoenician settlements in the Iberian West. The Phoenicians created a colonial urban center here with massive walls, at least one sanctuary, two harbours and a regular urban structure which lasted until the end of 6th century BC, when the location was abandoned in favour of a near-by site, probably due to the progressive progradation of the delta where it was located. Archaeological excavations brought to light part of a casemate fortification wall, ritual deposits and urban features pertaining to the settlement on the hill of Santa Maria.

It has been claimed that the original name of Tavira, Balsa, derives from the Phoenician storm god Baal-zephon, but other Phoenician origins have been suggested. The Roman town is located a short distance from the modern city.

After laying abandoned for a century, the settlement was revived and became even larger during the so-called Tartessian Period of Tavira. It was again abandoned by the end of the 4th century BC. Another urban center emerged at nearby Cerro do Cavaco, a fortified hill occupied until the time of Emperor Augustus.

=== The Roman Empire to the Moorish Conquest ===
During the time of Caesar, the Romans created a new port, some 7 kilometres (4 miles) from modern Tavira, that prospered, and decayed in parallel with the Roman Empire. When the Moors conquered Iberia in the 8th century, the port was already extinct.

Under Roman rule, Tavira was a secondary passing place on the important road between Balsa and Baesuris (modern Castro Marim).

=== Moorish Rule ===
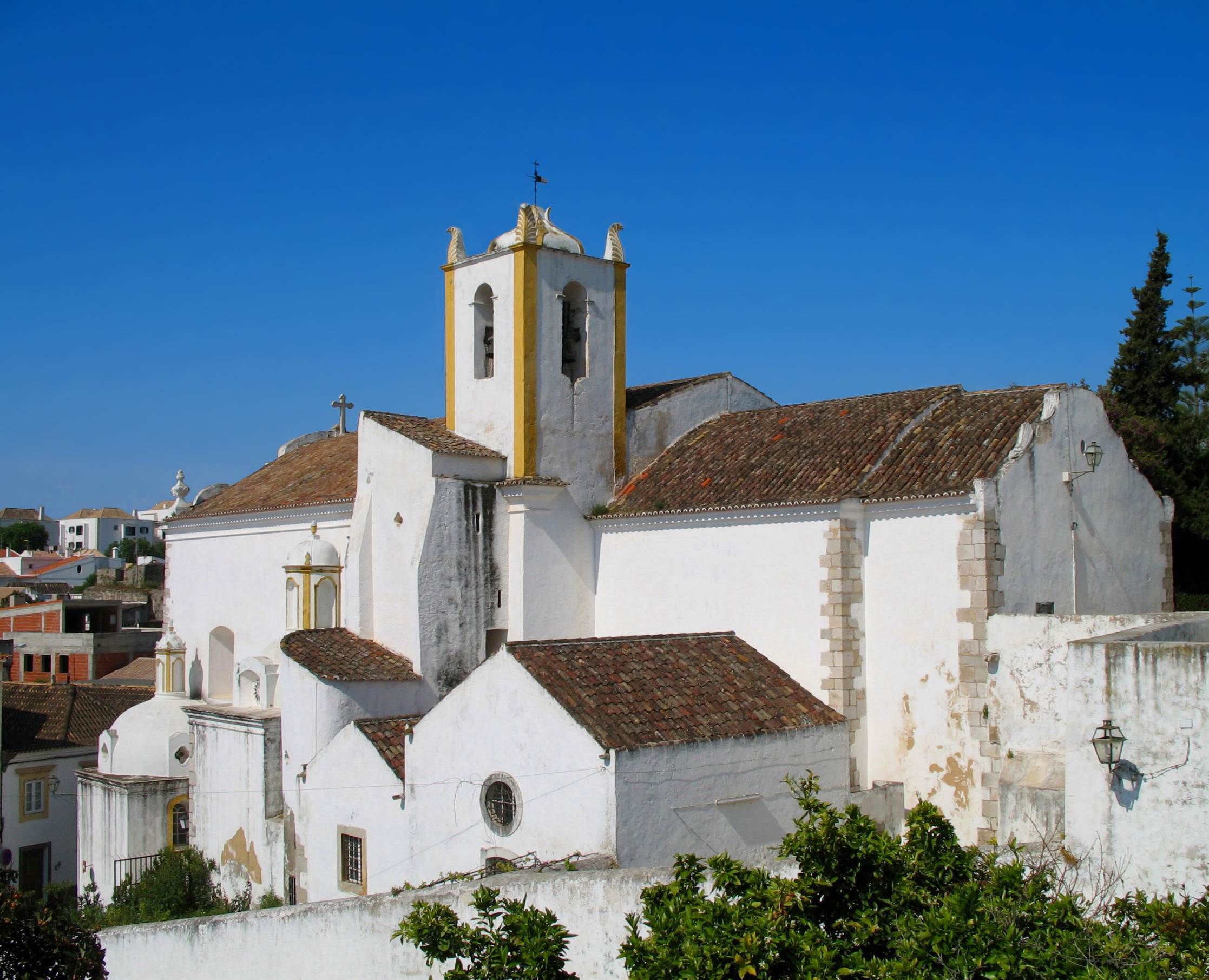
The Church of Santiago

Tavira's Moorish period (between the 8th and 13th centuries) influenced the agriculture, culture, and architecture of the area (as with its whitewashed buildings, Moorish style doors, and characteristic rooftops). The Tavira Castle, two mosques, and palaces were built by the Moors. An archaeological survey of the seven-arched Roman Bridge revealed that it was not constructed by the Romans, but was originally a 12th-century Moorish bridge.

Tavira prospered during the Middle Ages, which established itself as an important port for sailors and fishermen. The area remained predominantly rural until the 11th century, when the town grew rapidly, becoming one of the important settlements of the Gharb al-Andalus.

=== The Reconquista ===
In 1242 Dom Paio Peres Correia took Tavira back from the Moors in a bloody conflict of retaliation after seven of his principal Knights were killed during a period of truce. Dom Paio's Christian troops decimated most of Tavira's population and the few survivors were kept in a tiny quarter known as "Mouraria".

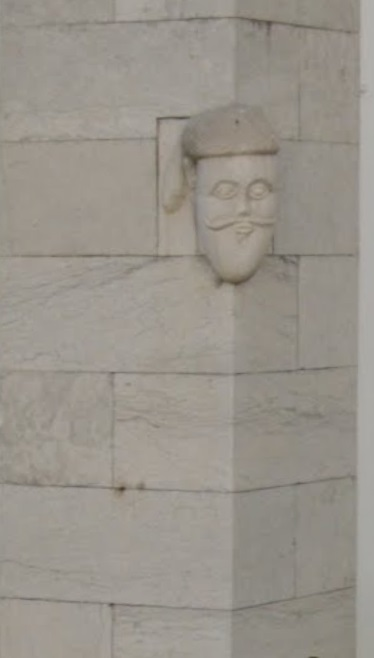
Supposed depiction of D. Paio Peres Correia, the city conqueror, on the corner of City Hall.

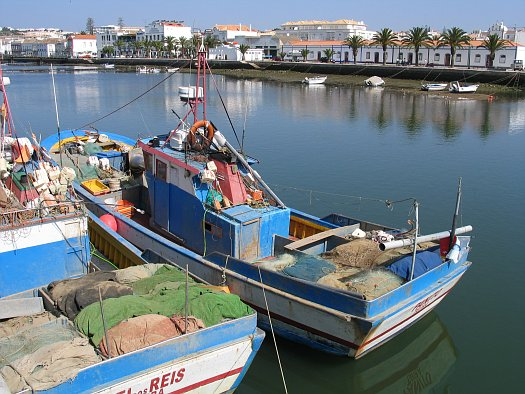
Fishing boat in Tavira

=== The 1755 earthquake ===
In the 18th century, the port on its river was of considerable importance for shipping produce such as salt, dried fish and wine. Like most of the Algarve, its buildings were virtually all destroyed by the earthquake of 1755. This earthquake is thought to have reached 8.5–9.0 on the moment magnitude scale and caused extensive damage throughout the Algarve due to high intensity shaking (XI (Extreme) on the Mercalli intensity scale) and tsunamis.

The earthquake is referred to as the Lisbon earthquake due to its terrible effects on the capital city, although the epicentre was some 200 km (124 mi) west-southwest of Cape St. Vincent in the Algarve region.

== Demographics ==
Pop. Tavira Municipality (1801–2011)
1801	1849	1900	1930	1940	1960	1981	1991	2001	2008	2011
10 557	14 162	25 392	27 786	28 920	27 798	24 615	24 857	24 997	25 394	26 167

== Tavira today ==
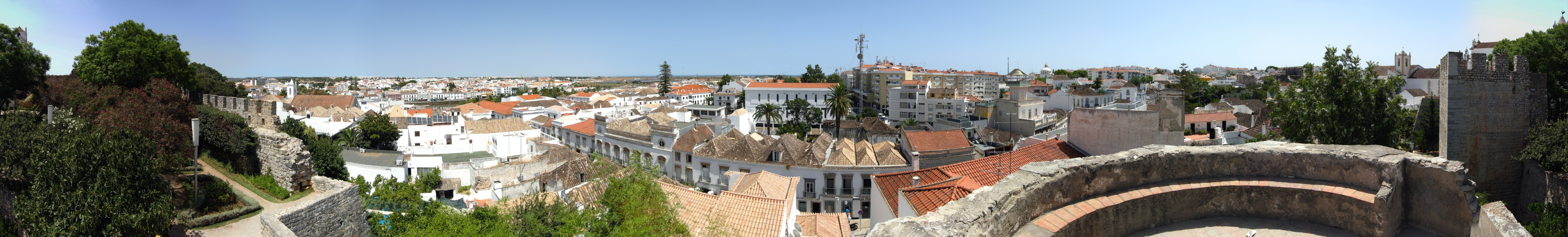
Panoramic view of Tavira, seen from the Castle

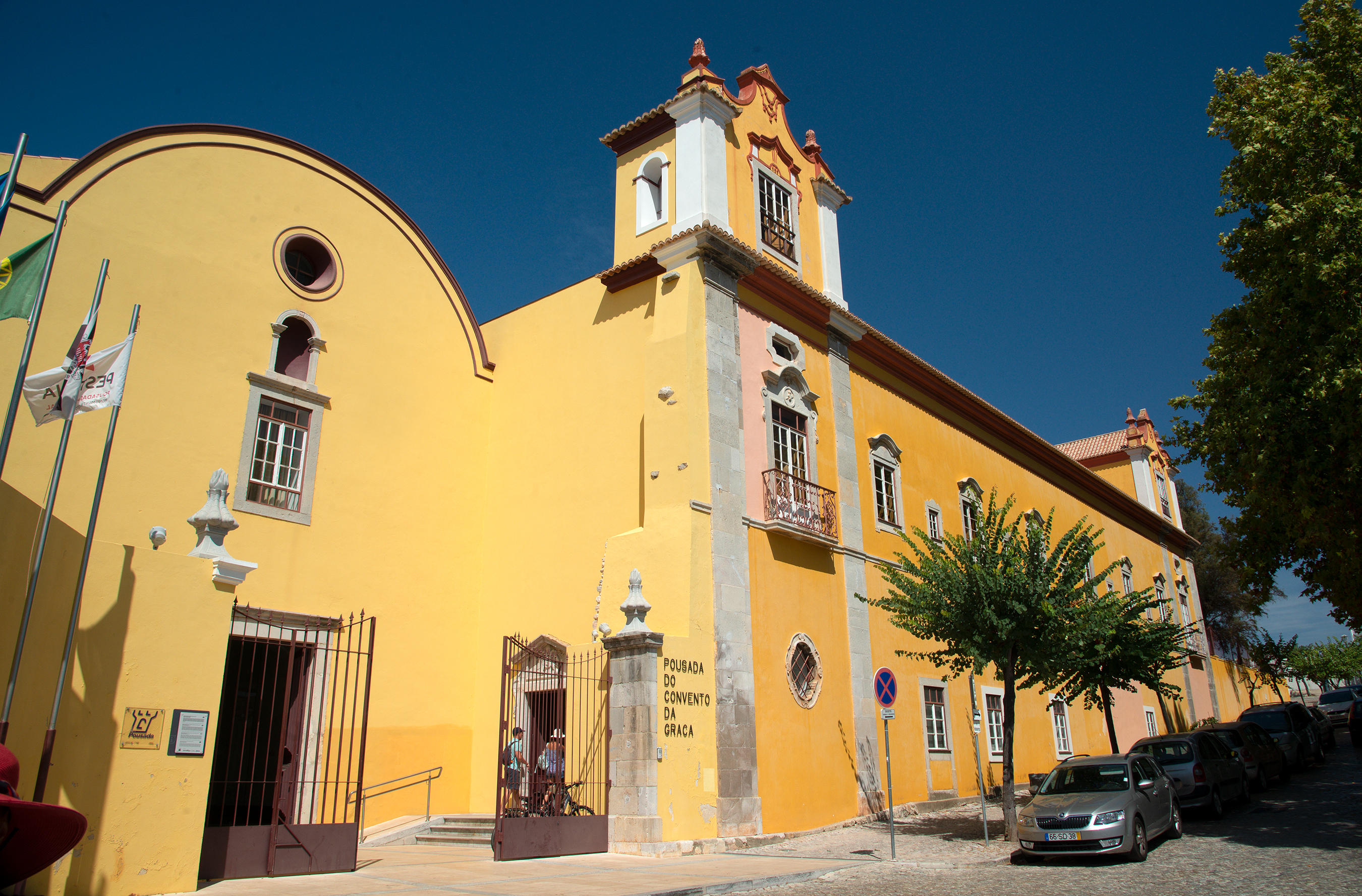
Pousada Convento de Tavira, now a hotel; the church was converted to a room that is a venue for various events

The city has since been rebuilt with many fine 18th-century buildings along with its 37 churches. A bridge links the two parts of the town across the River Gilão. The church of Santa Maria do Castelo, built on the ruins of a mosque, holds the tombs of Dom Paio Peres Correia and his knights. The church dates back to the 13th century, with the clock tower having been recreated from what was once a minaret. A bust of Dom Paio who died in Tavira in 1275, can be seen on the corner of the town hall.

At one time fishing was the area's primary industry but that declined, partly due to the changing migration patterns of tuna fish and advancing silt in the river Gilão.

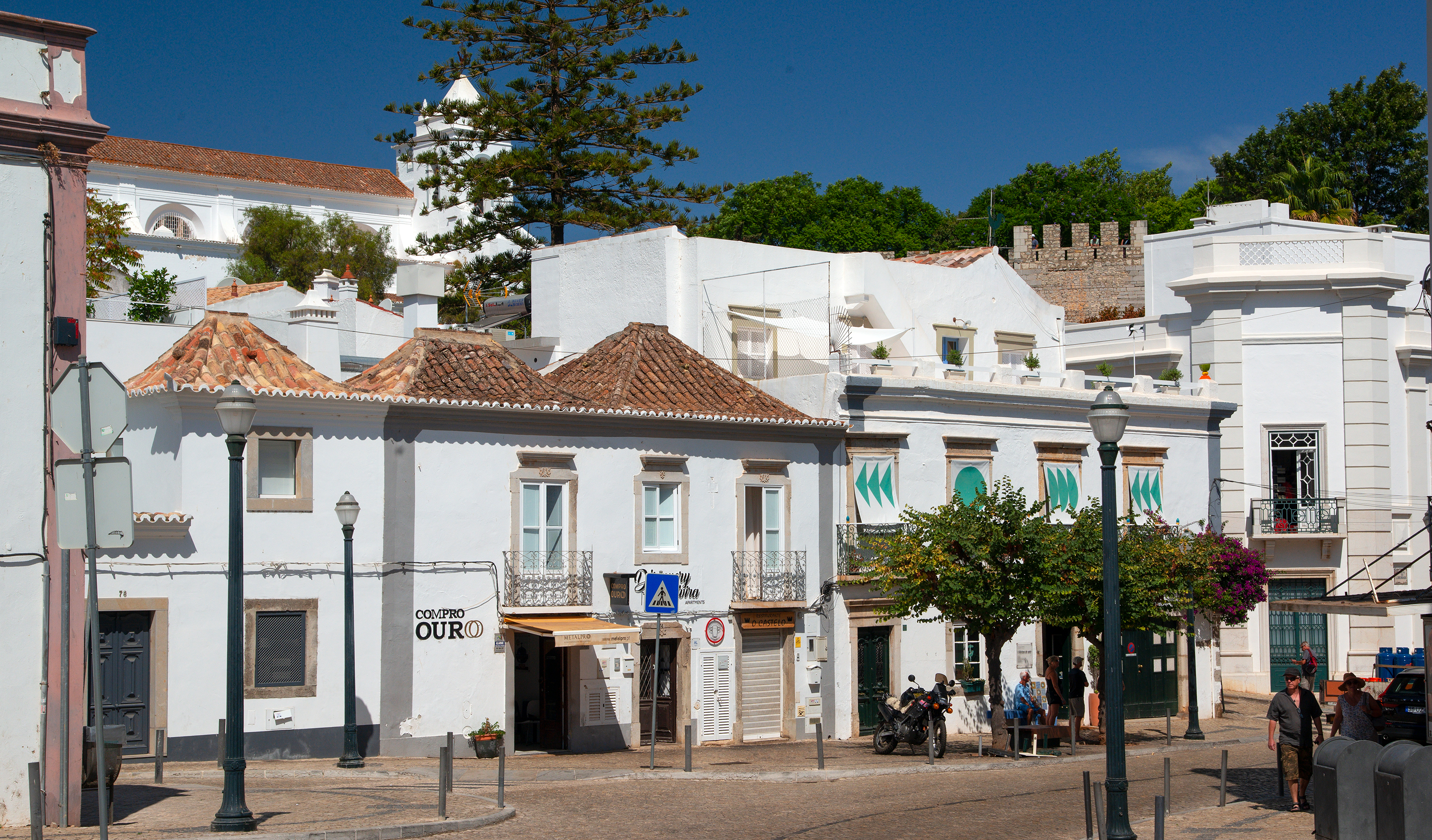
Historic centre of Tavira, 2019

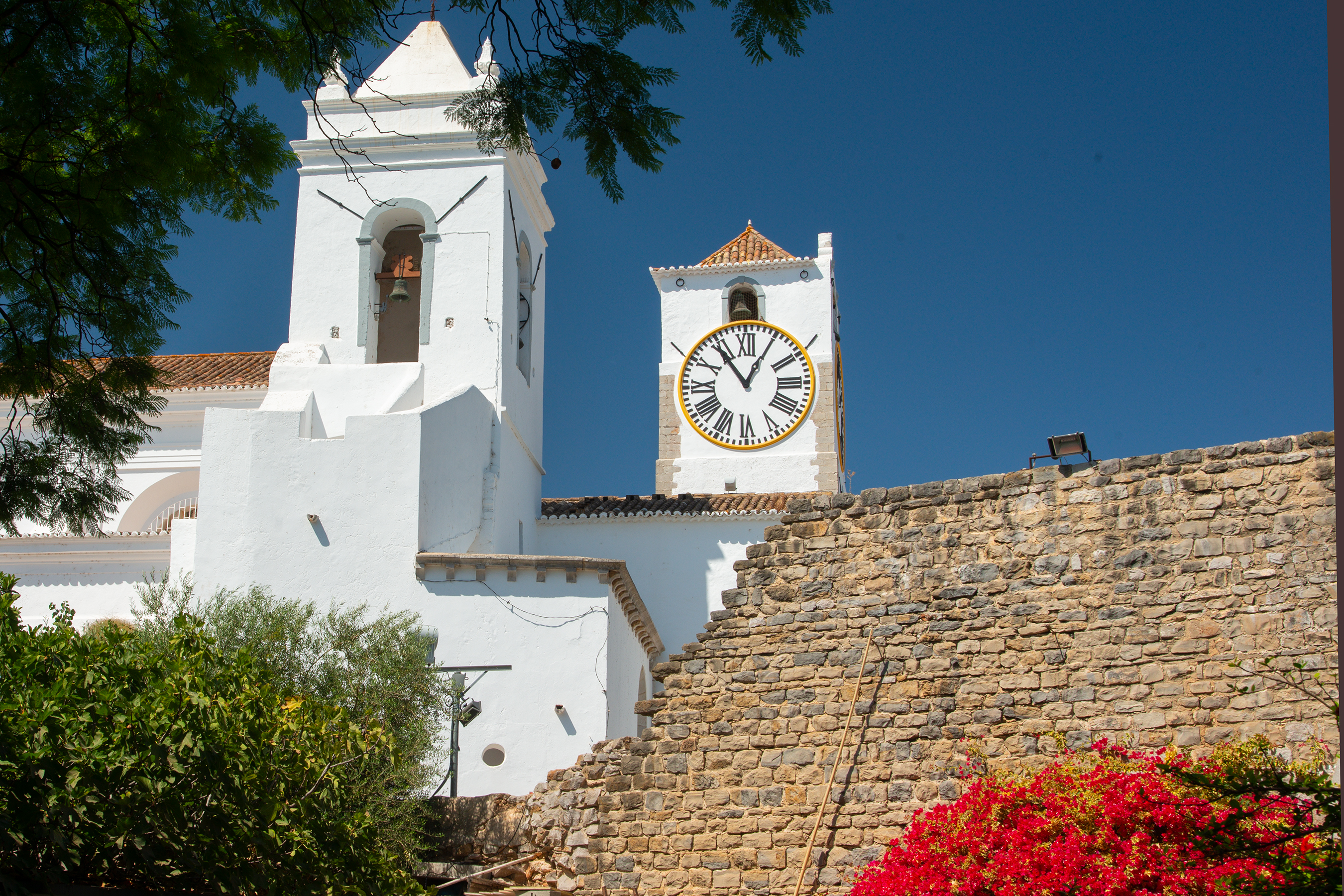
Bell and clock towers, Church of St James (Igreja Matriz de Santiago), Tavira

The population is in the region of 25,000 inhabitants (municipality of Tavira) supporting a military base. Although still relatively untouched by mass tourism, there are several golf courses in the vicinity. The local beach lies past the salt pans and can be reached via the nearby Santa Luzia footbridge or by ferry, taking visitors to the sand-bar island known as Ilha de Tavira, part of the Ria Formosa natural wetlands park. The nearby Praia do Barril beach has an 'anchor cemetery', where rusting anchors stand as a tribute to the area’s tuna fishing heritage.

In recent years the Gran Plaza shopping centre, incorporating a cinema, supermarket shops, and restaurants, was built on the outskirts of the town. House prices have increased sharply in recent years. The development of many golf clubs close to the town has also had an effect.

As one of the popular towns in the Algarve, Tavira benefits from tourism which is the primary aspect of the region's economy.

== Climate ==
Tavira has a hot-summer Mediterranean climate (Köppen Csa) with hot, dry summers and mild, wet winters. Together with Faro, it is among the sunniest cities in Portugal and in Europe, typically averaging around 3,150 hours of sunshine. Due to its location on the Algarvian Sotavento, Tavira is sheltered from frontal systems coming from the west but exposed to the influences of humid air masses coming from the south. The city receives predominantly western winds. Temperatures below 0 °C (32 °F) are registered, on average, once a year. In contrast to the western coasts of Portugal, fog is very uncommon in Tavira, occurring on average only three times a year.

Climate data for Tavira, elevation: 25 m or 82 ft, normals 1991-2020, extremes 1973-1994
Month	Jan	Feb	Mar	Apr	May	Jun	Jul	Aug	Sep	Oct	Nov	Dec	Year
Record high °C (°F)	22.0 (71.6)	24.5 (76.1)	28.5 (83.3)	30.0 (86.0)	32.6 (90.7)	37.4 (99.3)	39.0 (102.2)	39.4 (102.9)	39.2 (102.6)	34.0 (93.2)	28.0 (82.4)	24.0 (75.2)	39.4 (102.9)
Mean daily maximum °C (°F)	15.4 (59.7)	16.1 (61.0)	18.8 (65.8)	20.7 (69.3)	22.5 (72.5)	26.6 (79.9)	30.7 (87.3)	29.8 (85.6)	27.2 (81.0)	22.0 (71.6)	19.2 (66.6)	16.5 (61.7)	22.1 (71.8)
Daily mean °C (°F)	11.0 (51.8)	11.8 (53.2)	14.1 (57.4)	15.4 (59.7)	17.8 (64.0)	21.4 (70.5)	25.0 (77.0)	24.2 (75.6)	21.8 (71.2)	17.7 (63.9)	15.0 (59.0)	12.9 (55.2)	17.3 (63.2)
Mean daily minimum °C (°F)	6.6 (43.9)	7.6 (45.7)	9.5 (49.1)	10.1 (50.2)	13.1 (55.6)	16.2 (61.2)	19.2 (66.6)	18.7 (65.7)	16.3 (61.3)	13.3 (55.9)	10.9 (51.6)	9.2 (48.6)	12.6 (54.6)
Record low °C (°F)	−2.0 (28.4)	−1.5 (29.3)	0.5 (32.9)	3.0 (37.4)	4.2 (39.6)	7.2 (45.0)	9.5 (49.1)	11.0 (51.8)	8.4 (47.1)	5.2 (41.4)	1.5 (34.7)	−2.0 (28.4)	−2.0 (28.4)
Average rainfall mm (inches)	30.7 (1.21)	68.3 (2.69)	42.0 (1.65)	38.8 (1.53)	38.7 (1.52)	11.9 (0.47)	0.2 (0.01)	2.1 (0.08)	12.3 (0.48)	55.9 (2.20)	45.6 (1.80)	89.8 (3.54)	436.3 (17.18)
Average rainy days (≥ 1.0 mm)	5.7	5.4	4.4	5.7	2.9	1.1	0.4	0.4	1.7	5.0	6.9	7.6	47.2
Average relative humidity (%)	80	79	72	69	64	63	59	58	64	72	77	79	70
Mean monthly sunshine hours	170.8	193.4	206.0	277.4	334.6	358.1	395.3	370.4	290.5	243.0	172.5	164.9	3,176.9
Percentage possible sunshine	55	63	55	52	75	81	89	88	78	70	57	55	68
Source 1: Météo Climat 1991-2020, 1973-1994
Source 2: IPMA (1951-1980 sunshine hours), (1961-1990 Humidity)

== Parishes ==
Administratively, the municipality is divided into 6 civil parishes (freguesias):

- Conceição e Cabanas de Tavira
- Cachopo
- Luz de Tavira e Santo Estêvão
- Santa Catarina da Fonte do Bispo
- Santa Luzia
- Tavira (Santa Maria e Santiago)
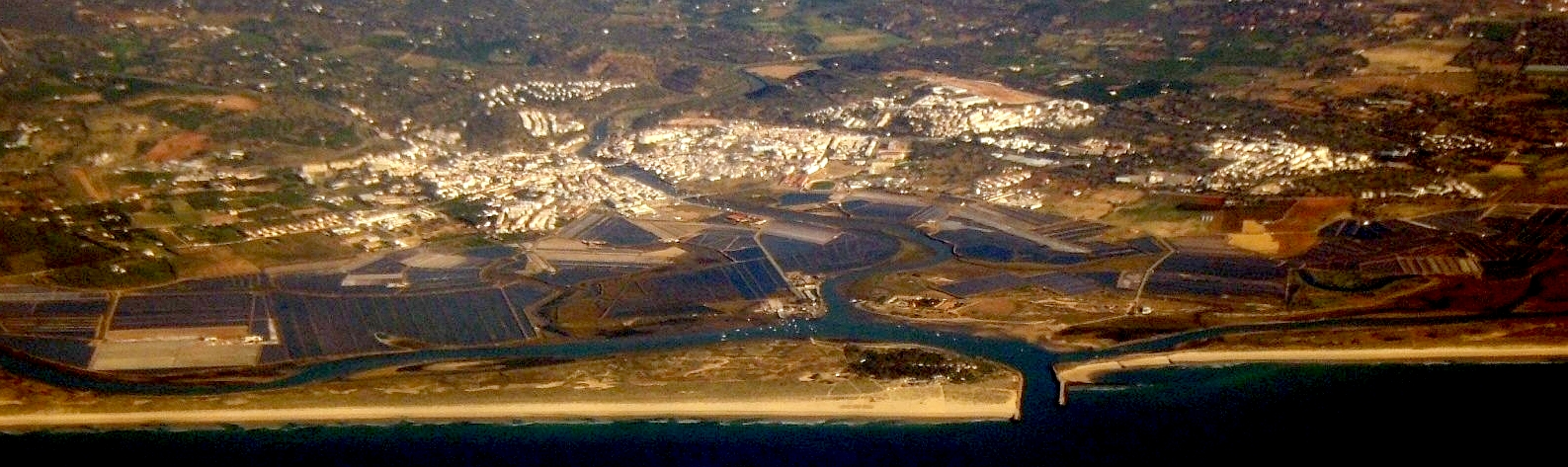
Aerial view of Tavira

== Transport ==
Tavira has its own railway station on the line from Vila Real de Santo António to Faro and Lagos. Trains are operated by Comboios de Portugal (CP). Connections are available at Faro station for trains to Lisbon and the rest of Portugal.

The A22 motorway passes near to the town. This offers fast road access along the Algarve coast and eastwards to Seville.

The nearest international airports are Faro and Seville.

== International relations ==
Tavira is a member of Cittaslow.

Tavira is twinned with:

- Kenitra, Morocco
- Łańcut, Poland
- Tabira, Brazil
- Perpignan, France
- Porto Novo, Cape Verde
- Punta Umbría, Spain
- San Bartolomé de la Torre, Spain

The Associação Internacional de Paremiologia / International Association of Paremiology (AIP-IAP) is based in Tavira. It hosts an annual conference of proverb scholars in Tavira.

== Notable people ==
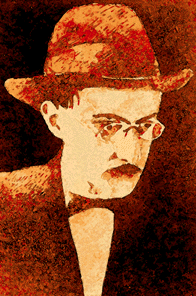
portrait of Álvaro de Campos

- The Corte-Real family nobles originated in the 14th century in Tavira
- Diogo de Mendonça Corte-Real (1658–1736) a diplomat and statesman
- Józef Karol Konrad Chełmicki (1814-1890) a Polish-born Portuguese general
- Estácio da Veiga (1828–1891) a Portuguese archeologist
- António Cabreira (1868–1953) aristocrat, mathematician, polygraph and publicist
- Álvaro de Campos (1890–1935) heteronym of the poet Fernando Pessoa, known for his powerful and wrathful writing, being the family from his father side from Tavira

=== Sport ===
- Miguel Cabrita (born 1974) swimmer, competed at the 1992 and 1996 Summer Olympics
- Fernando Livramento (born 1982) a former footballer with 369 club caps
- João Neves (footballer) (born 2004) international footballer currently playing for Paris Saint-Germain

== See also ==
- Tavira DOC
- Tavira Island
