= Faro District =

District of Portugal

Coordinates: 37°00′54″N 7°56′06″W

Faro
- District
- Flag Coat of arms

- Location of Faro within continental Portugal
- Country: Portugal
- Region: Algarve
- Historical province: Algarve
- Number of municipalities: 16
- Number of parishes: 76
- Capital: Faro

Area
  - Total: 4,960 km^{2} (1,920 sq mi)

Population
  - Total: 458,734
  - Density: 92.5/km^{2} (240/sq mi)
- ISO 3166 code: PT-08
- No. of parliamentary representatives: 9

Faro (Note: [ˈfaɾu]) is the southernmost district of Portugal. The area is the same as that of the Algarve region. The administrative centre, or district capital, is the city of Faro. It borders Spain.

== Municipalities ==
The district is composed of 16 municipalities:

- Albufeira
- Alcoutim
- Aljezur
- Castro Marim
- Faro
- Lagoa
- Lagos
- Loulé
- Monchique
- Olhão
- Portimão
- São Brás de Alportel
- Silves
- Tavira
- Vila do Bispo
- Vila Real de Santo António

All 16 municipalities are divided into 76 parishes or freguesias.

== Cities ==
- Albufeira
- Faro
- Lagoa
- Lagos
- Loulé
- Olhão
- Portimão
- Quarteira (Loulé)
- Silves
- Tavira
- Vila Real de Santo António

== Villages ==
- Alcantarilha (Silves)
- Alcoutim
- Algoz (Silves)
- Almancil (Loulé)
- Alvor (Portimão)
- Armação de Pêra (Silves)
- Aljezur
- Bensafrim (Lagos)
- Cabanas de Tavira (Tavira)
- Carvoeiro (Lagoa)
- Castro Marim
- Estômbar (Lagoa)
- Ferragudo (Lagoa)
- Fuseta (Olhão)
- Luz (Lagos)
- Luz de Tavira (Tavira)
- Mexilhoeira Grande (Olhão)
- Moncarapacho (Olhão)
- Monchique
- Monte Gordo (Vila Real de Santo António)
- Odeceixe (Aljezur)
- Odiáxere (Lagos)
- Parchal (Lagoa)
- Pêra (Silves)
- Porches (Lagoa)
- Sagres (Vila do Bispo)
- Salir (Loulé)
- Santa Luzia (Tavira)
- São Bartolomeu de Messines (Silves)
- São Brás de Alportel
- Vila do Bispo
- Vila Nova de Cacela (Vila Real de Santo António)

== History ==
=== Pre-Roman Times ===
In Pre-Roman Portugal, the area was inhabited by the Cynetes (or Conii), a people (formed by several tribes) of linguistic and ethnic affiliation, possibly Celtic or Iberian, whose territory included the modern area of the Beja District. This former territory of the Cysteines ran from the mouth of the Mira River all the way to the Guadiana River. It is possible that they were related to the Tartessos (people whose linguistic and ethnic affiliation is also not yet fully known or determined), but were not the same people.

=== Roman Times ===
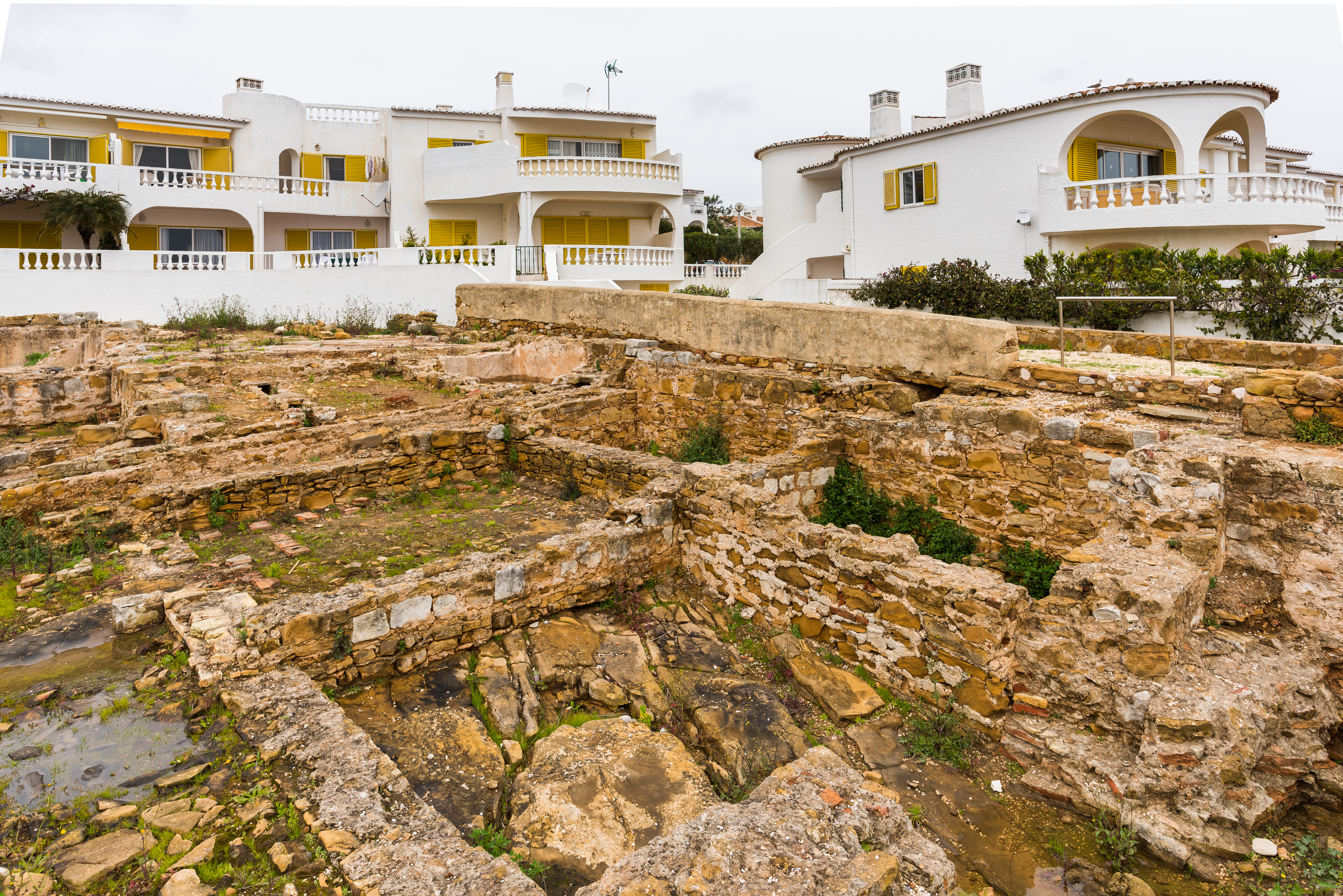
Roman baths at Praia da Luz, Lagos

Before the definitive integration of the canons into the Roman Empire, during the period from about 200 BC to 141 BC, they were under strong Roman influence, but enjoyed a high degree of autonomy. In part due to the favorable relationship with the Romans, the colonies had some conflicts with the Lusitanians, who under the leadership of Caucenus, the Lusitanian leader before Viriathus, had conquered their territory for some time, including the capital, Conistorgis (whose location is still not known, but is thought to be in modern-day Faro or Castro Marim) in 153 BC. Partly due to the conflict with the Portuguese (and partly due to the cultural influence of Mediterranean civilizations), unlike many pre-Roman peoples of Portugal, they were allies of the Romans for some time and not their opponents, differing from the attitude of most of the other peoples, such as the Lusitanians who were strong opponents of the Romans.

Nevertheless, a while later, in the context of the Lusitanian Wars, in the year of 141BC, the Conidia revolted against the Roman Empire, along with the Turduli of Beturia (also called betures), but were quickly defeated by Quintus Fabius Maximus Servilianus, a Roman proconsul, and was definitively integrated into the Roman Empire.

=== Barbarian Era ===
Despite being conquered by the so-called barbarian peoples (Vandals, Alans, Suebi, and later Visigoths) at the time of Barbarian migrations or invasions, Roman culture and Christianity remained there for a period of time. In the year 552, the current area of Algarve was regained by the Eastern Roman Empire or Byzantine Empire (then governed by Emperor Justinian I), and a government was appointed that lasted until the year 571, when King Liuvigild conquered it for the Visigothic Kingdom.

== Fauna ==
The Cape St. Vincent is situated in a route of migrating birds, allowing for the seasonal observation of the variety of bird life.

The subsoil of the district is inhabited by several endemic species unique to Faro, some still just being discovered. The most emblematic species of the underground fauna of the Algarve are the giant pseudo-scorpion of the Algarve caves (Titanobochica magna) and the largest terrestrial cave insect in Europe, Squamatinia algharbica.

== Summary of votes and seats won (1976–2022) ==
Summary of election results from Faro district, 1976-2022
Parties	%	S	%	S	%	S	%	S	%	S	%	S	%	S	%	S	%	S	%	S	%	S	%	S	%	S	%	S	%	S	%	S
Parties	1976		1979		1980		1983		1985		1987		1991		1995		1999		2002		2005		2009		2011		2015		2019		2022	
PS	44.6	6	34.0	3	34.7	4	43.2	5	22.3	2	24.9	3	31.2	3	49.6	5	48.4	5	40.5	4	49.3	6	31.9	3	23.0	2	32.8	4	36.8	5	39.9	5
PSD	19.3	2	In AD				23.1	2	28.4	3	46.7	5	50.8	5	29.2	3	29.5	3	37.7	4	24.6	2	26.2	3	37.0	4	In PàF		22.3	3	24.4	3
CDS-PP	6.8		In AD				7.4		6.1		3.1		2.8		8.3		7.3		8.3		5.8		10.7	1	12.7	1	In PàF		3.8		1.1	
PCP/APU/CDU	14.5	1	20.3	2	16.7	1	18.6	2	15.4	2	10.9	1	7.2		7.8		8.3		6.3		6.9		7.8		8.6	1	8.7	1	7.1		4.8	
AD			34.6	4	37.2	4																										
PRD									20.5	2	6.3																					
BE																	2.3		2.8		7.7		15.3	1	8.2	1	14.1	1	12.3	1	5.8	
PàF																											31.5	3				
Total seats	9												8												9							
Source: Comissão Nacional de Eleições

== See also ==
- Faro, Portugal
- Algarve
- Senhora do Verde, a village in the district of Faro
