= Fort São Sebastião (Castro Marim) =

- Forte de São Sebastião
- Castro Marim, Portugal
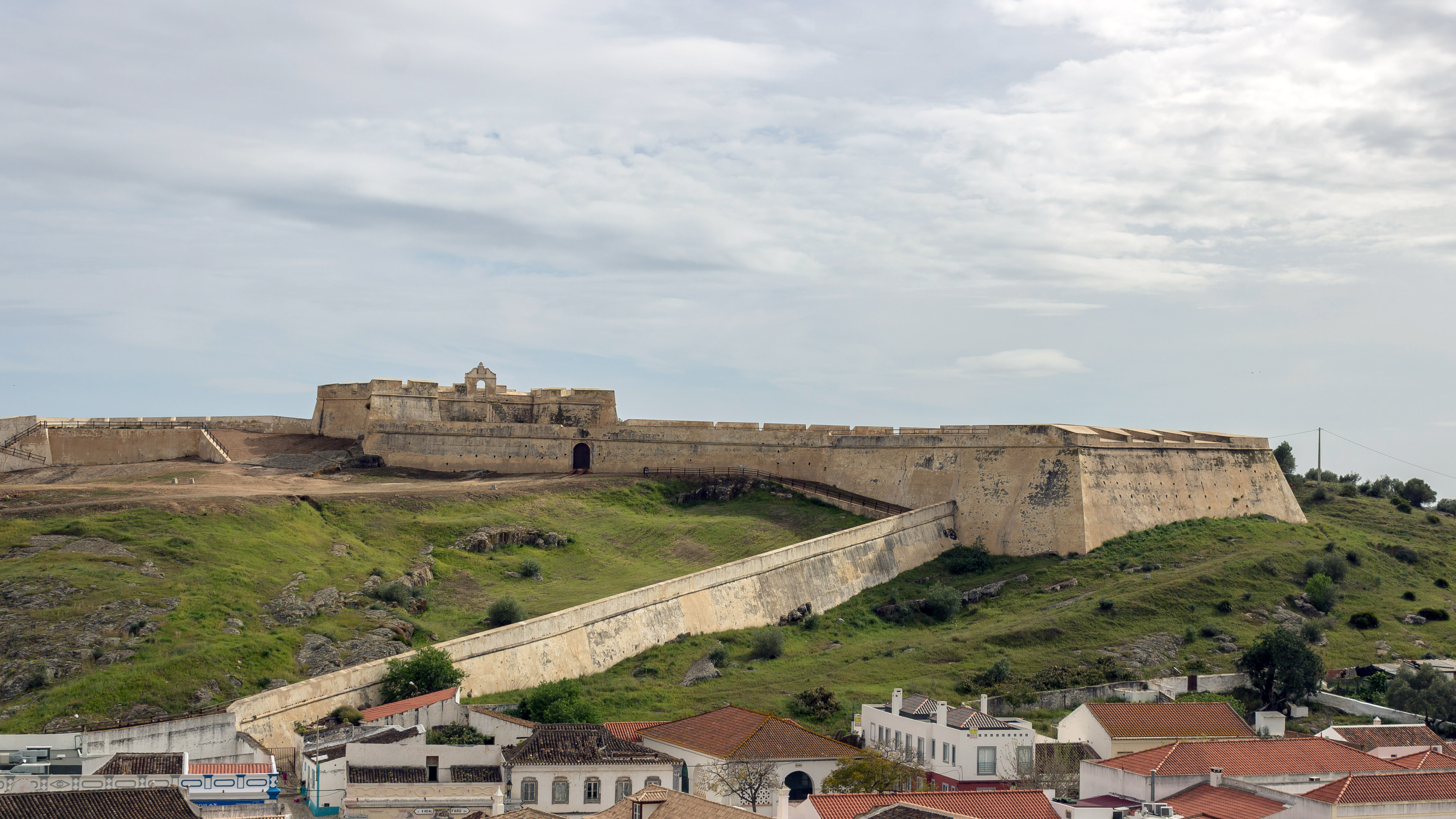
- View of the fort from the medieval castle.

Site information
- Type: Bastion fort
- Condition: Good.

Location
- Coordinates: 37°13′0″N 7°26′36″W

Site history
- Built: 1640-1656
- In use: 17th century.

The Fort São Sebastião of Castro Marim (Forte de São Sebastão de Castro Marim in Portuguese) is located in the village, parish and municipality of Castro Marim, in the District of Faro, in Portugal.

The fort is located to the south of Monte do Castelo, in Serra do Cabeço, where there was originally a hermitage under the invocation of Saint Sebastian, demolished during the fortification works. Its importance stems from it being the best preserved example of the extensive process of renovation of the town's defensive system in the mid-17th century.

The fort has been classified as a National Monument since 2012.

== History ==
Work on the fort began in April 1641 under the reign of John IV (1640-1656), from 1641 onwards, during the War of Restoration of Portuguese Independence, with the aim of strengthening the defense of this strategic section of the border. It was completed in 1658. Its design aimed to modernize the protection provided by the old medieval castle, transforming the village into the main stronghold of the Algarve at the time. A new set of walls connecting the fort to the town and medieval castle was later built, during the 17th century.

The defensive set was complemented by the ravelin Santo António, to the east of the village.

Underground magazines and casemates were built between 1819 and 1829 housed the Battalion of Caçadores 4. The gates São Sebastião and Santo António and the walls they were built into were demolished in 1877.

== Features ==
The fort has an organic polygon plan (adapted to the terrain), with five bastions, named S. Sebastião, Baluarte Cheio, Baluarte das Lezírias, Baluarte da Bandeira.

The main gate faces north, towards the village, communicating with the old castle through a wall and covered entrance. In this way, the integration of the 18th century bastion system with the old walled enclosure of the village can be observed.

== Gallery ==
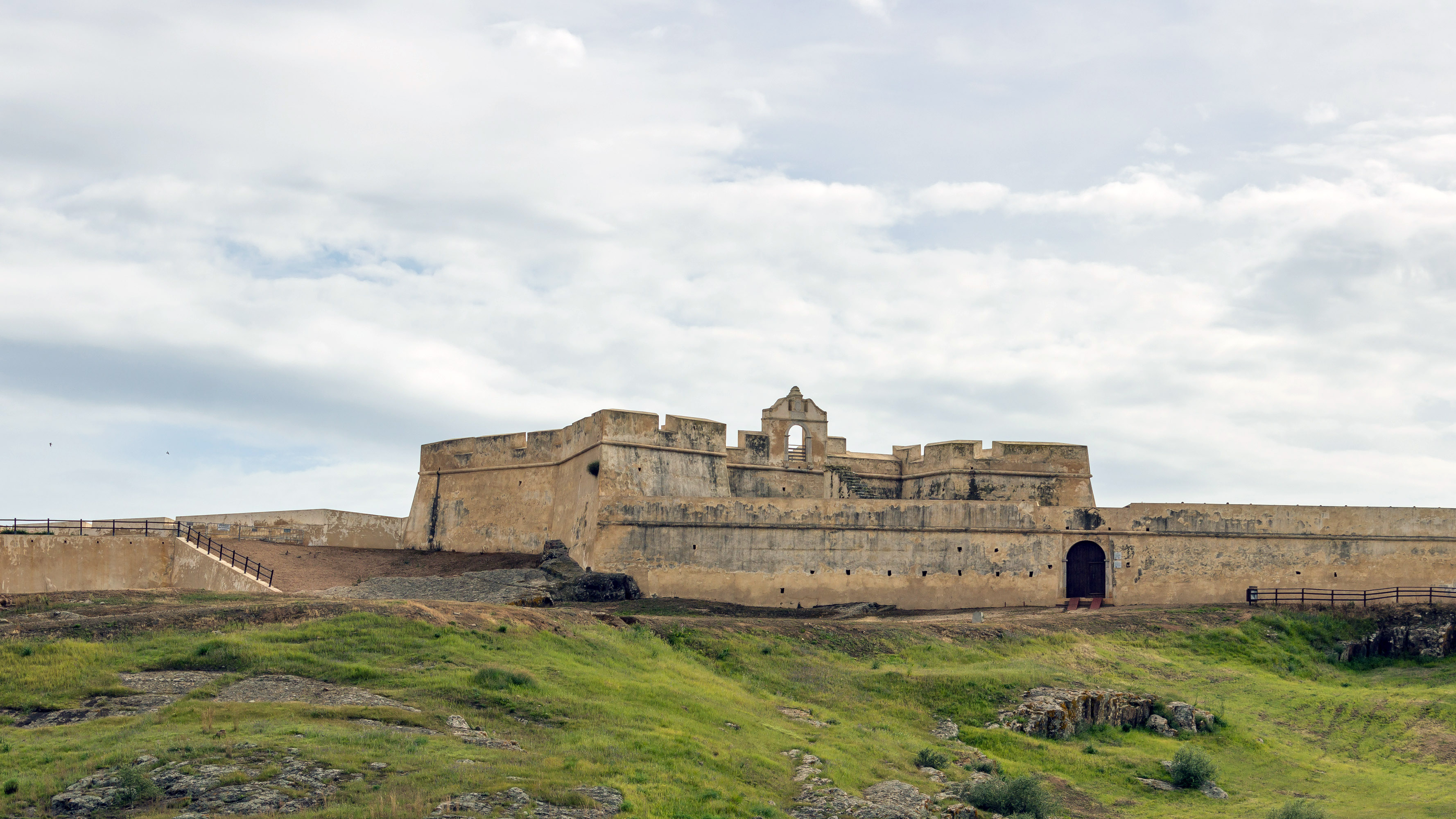

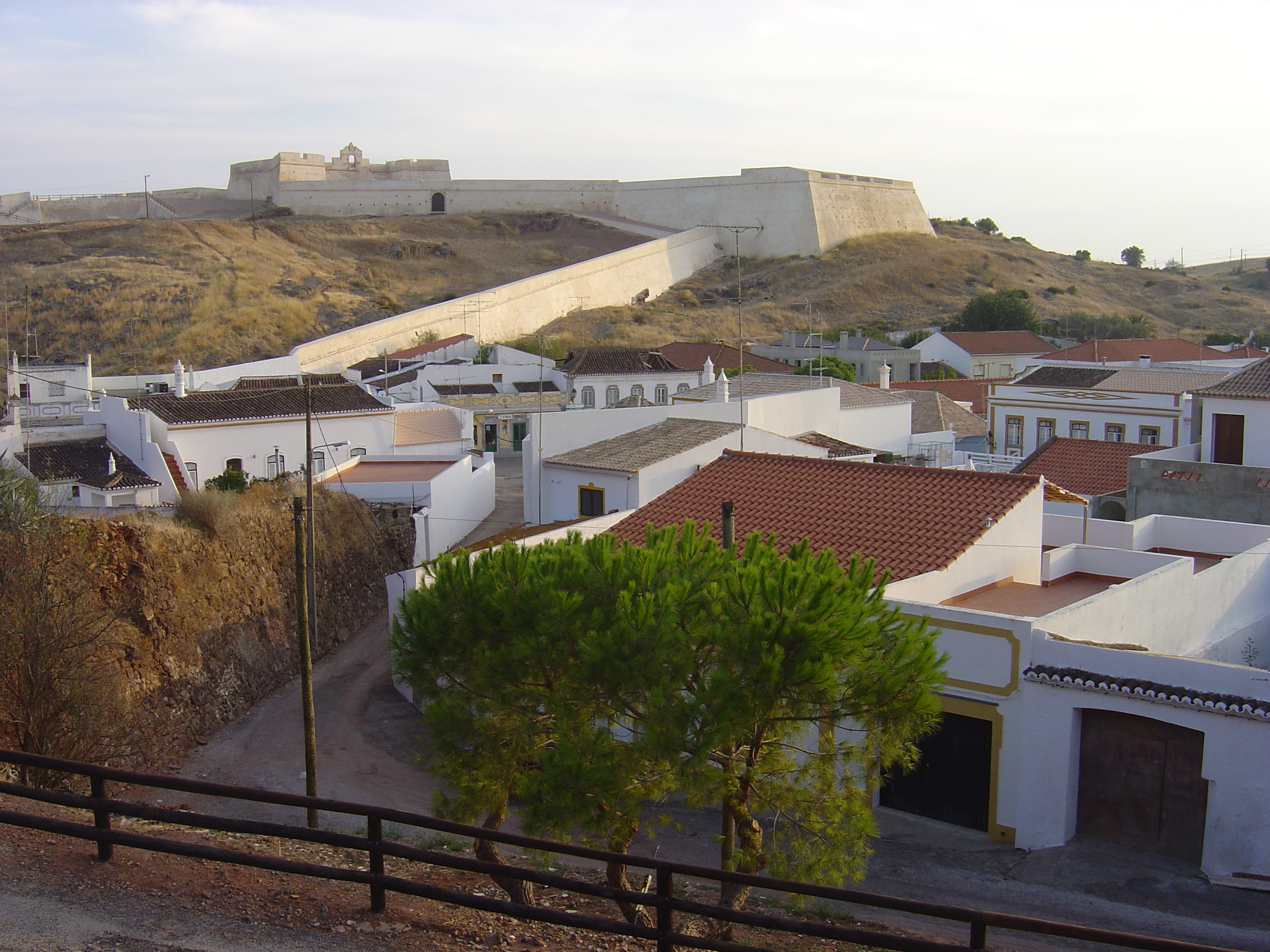

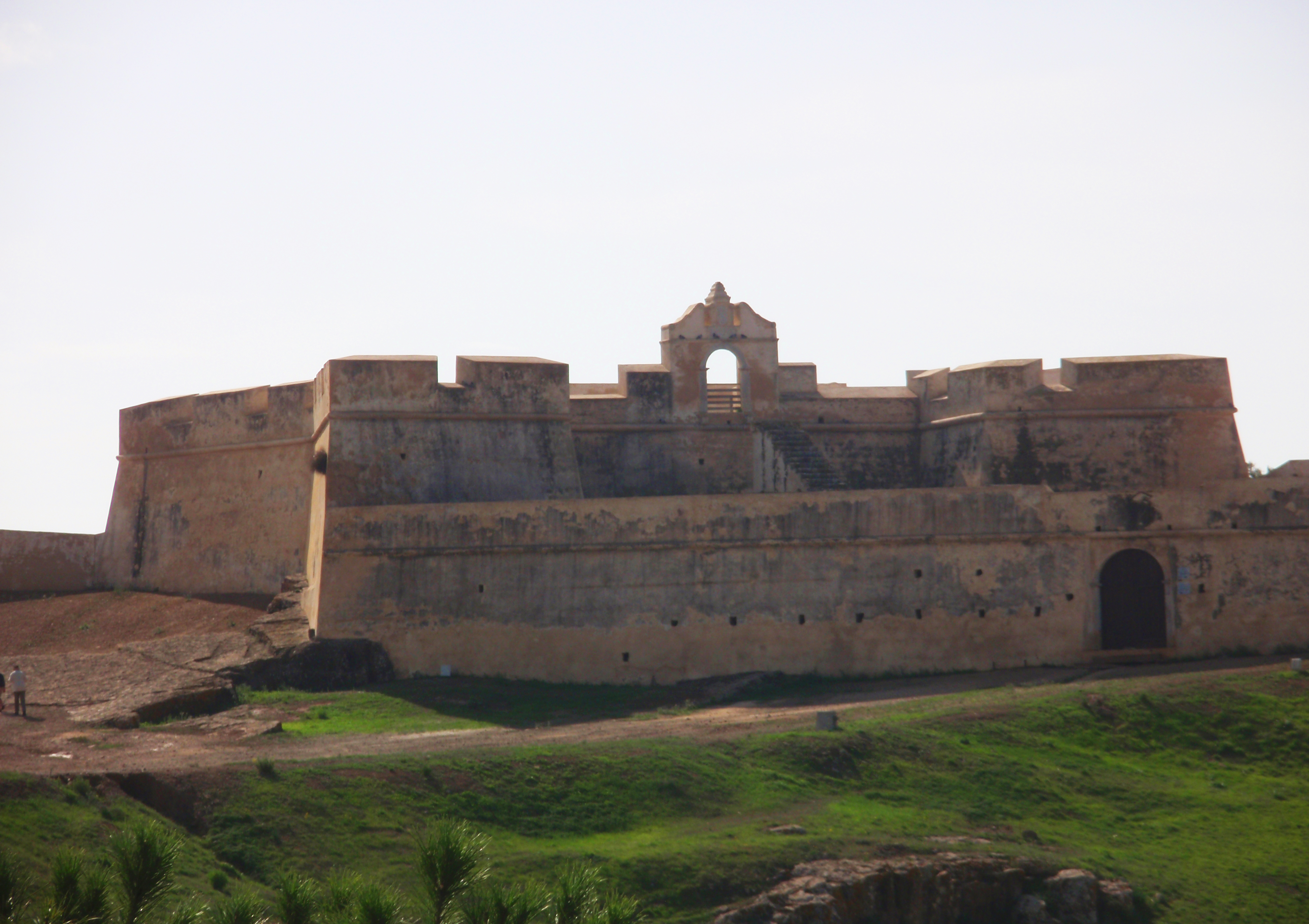

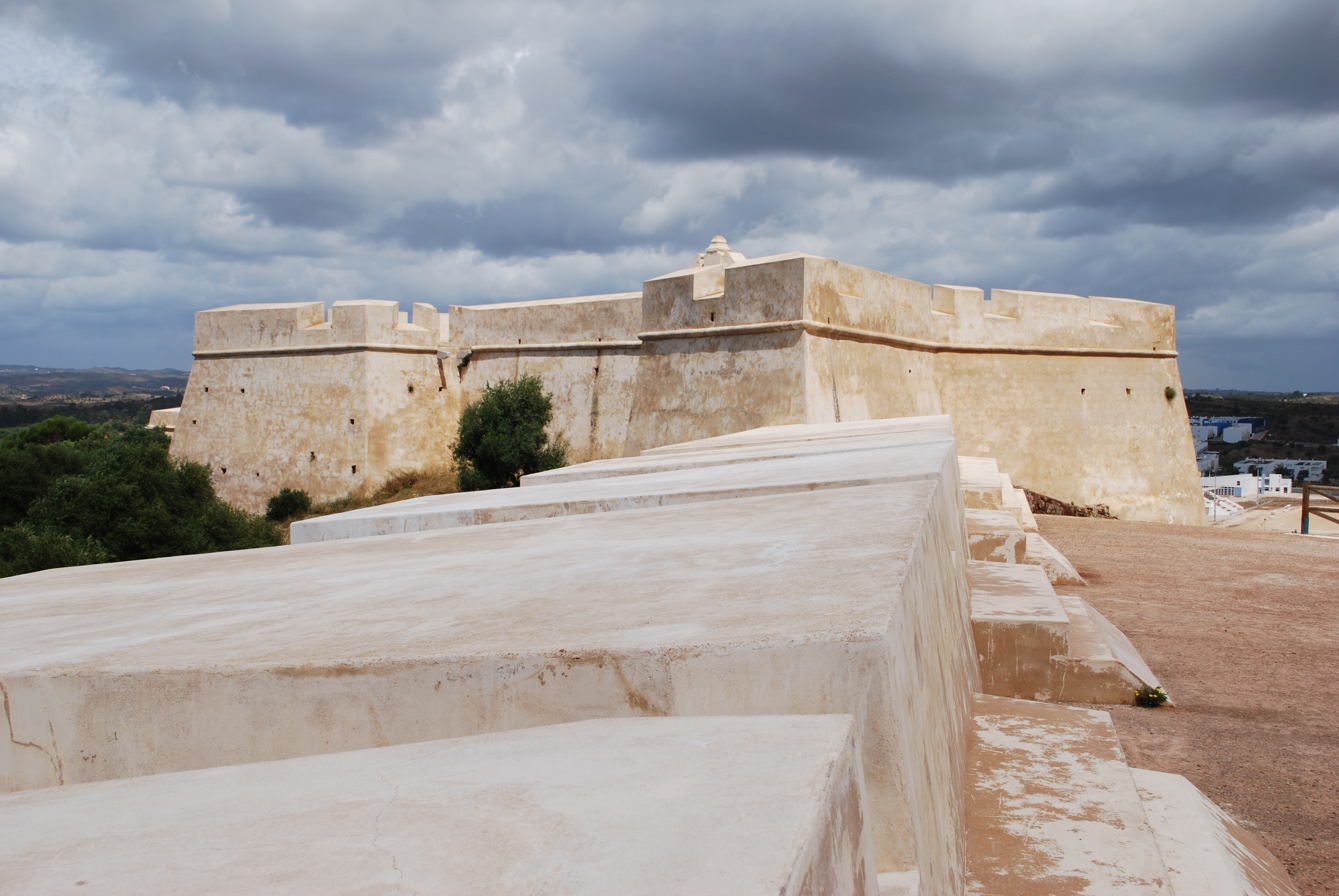

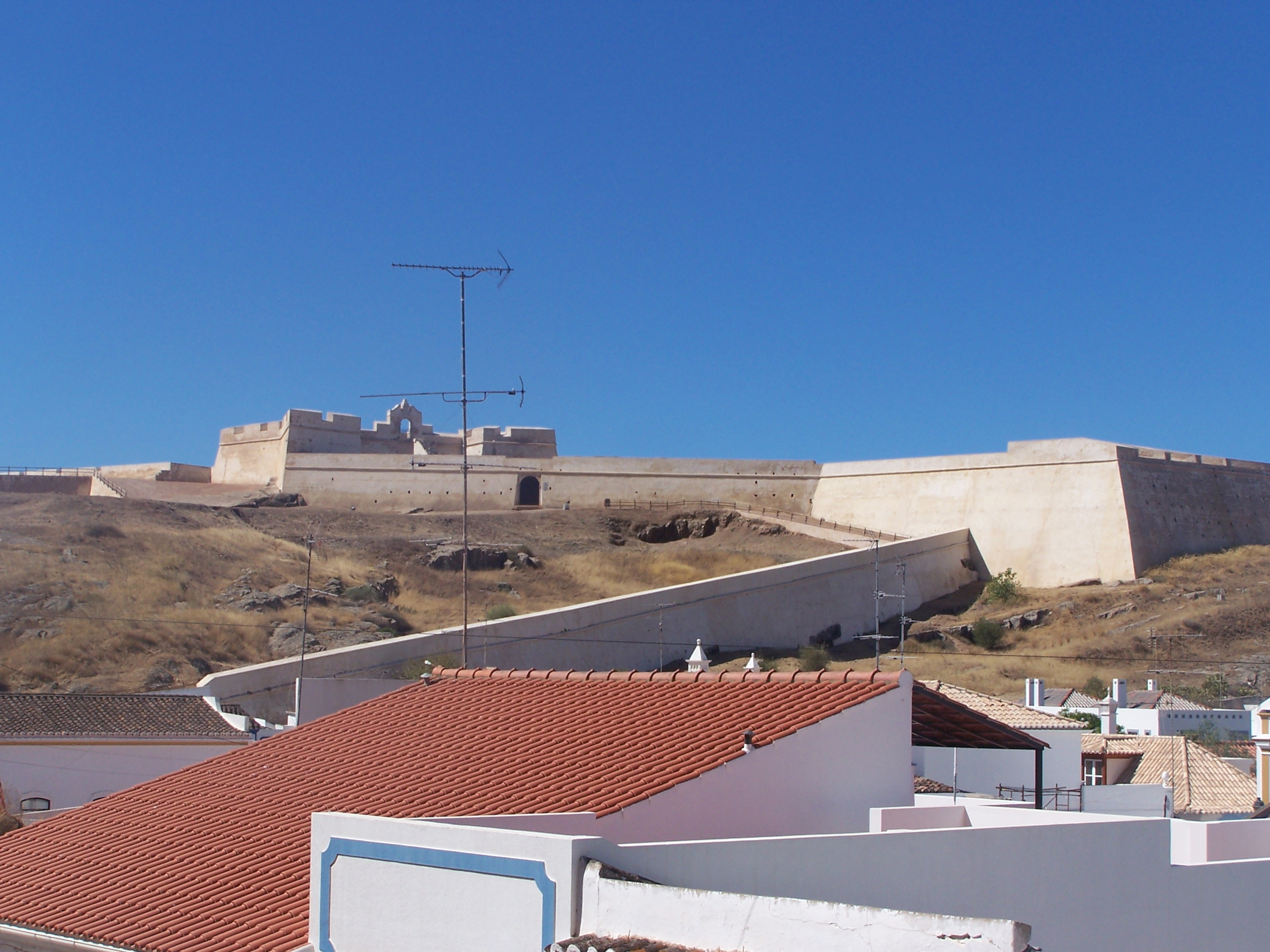

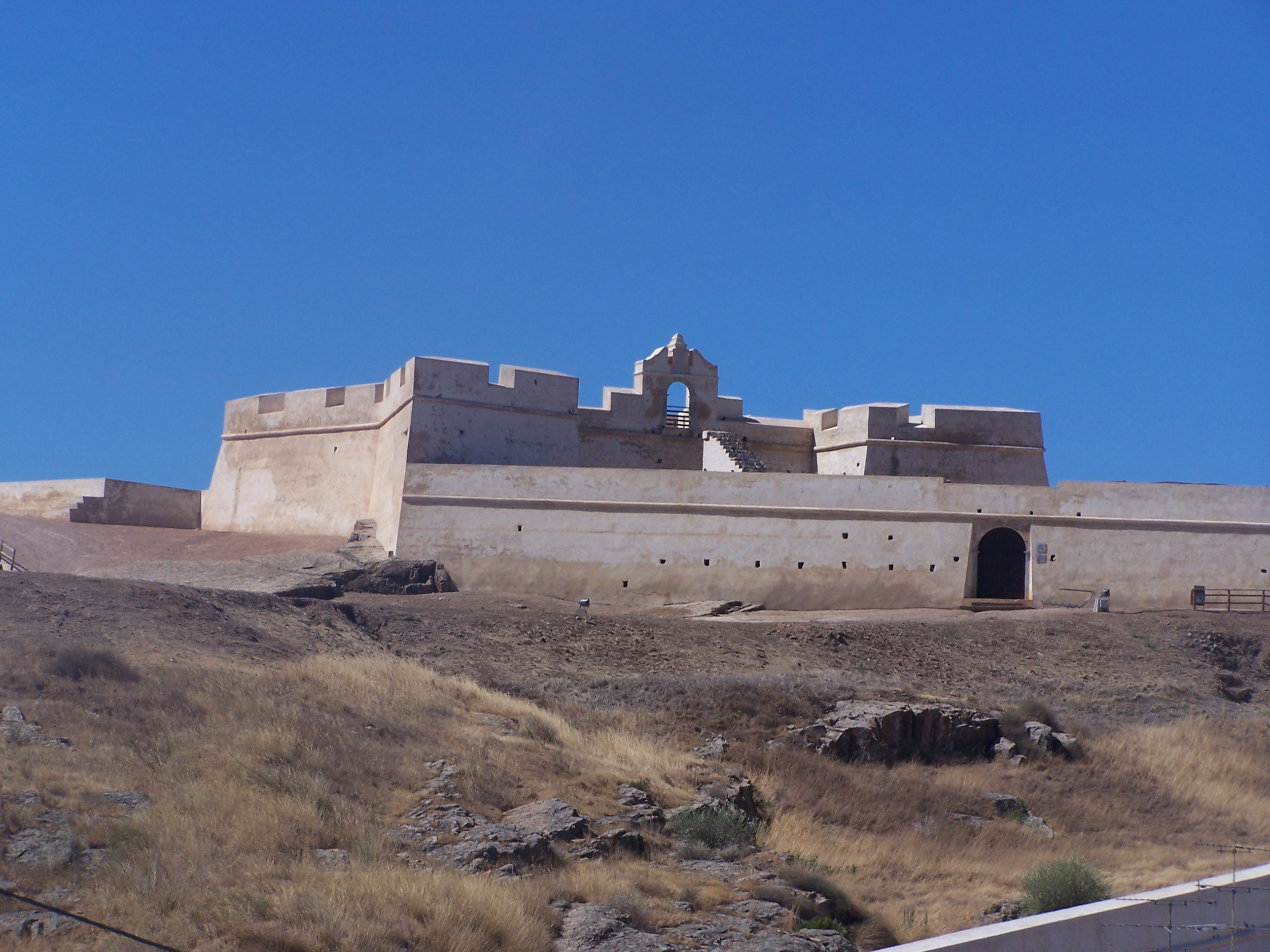

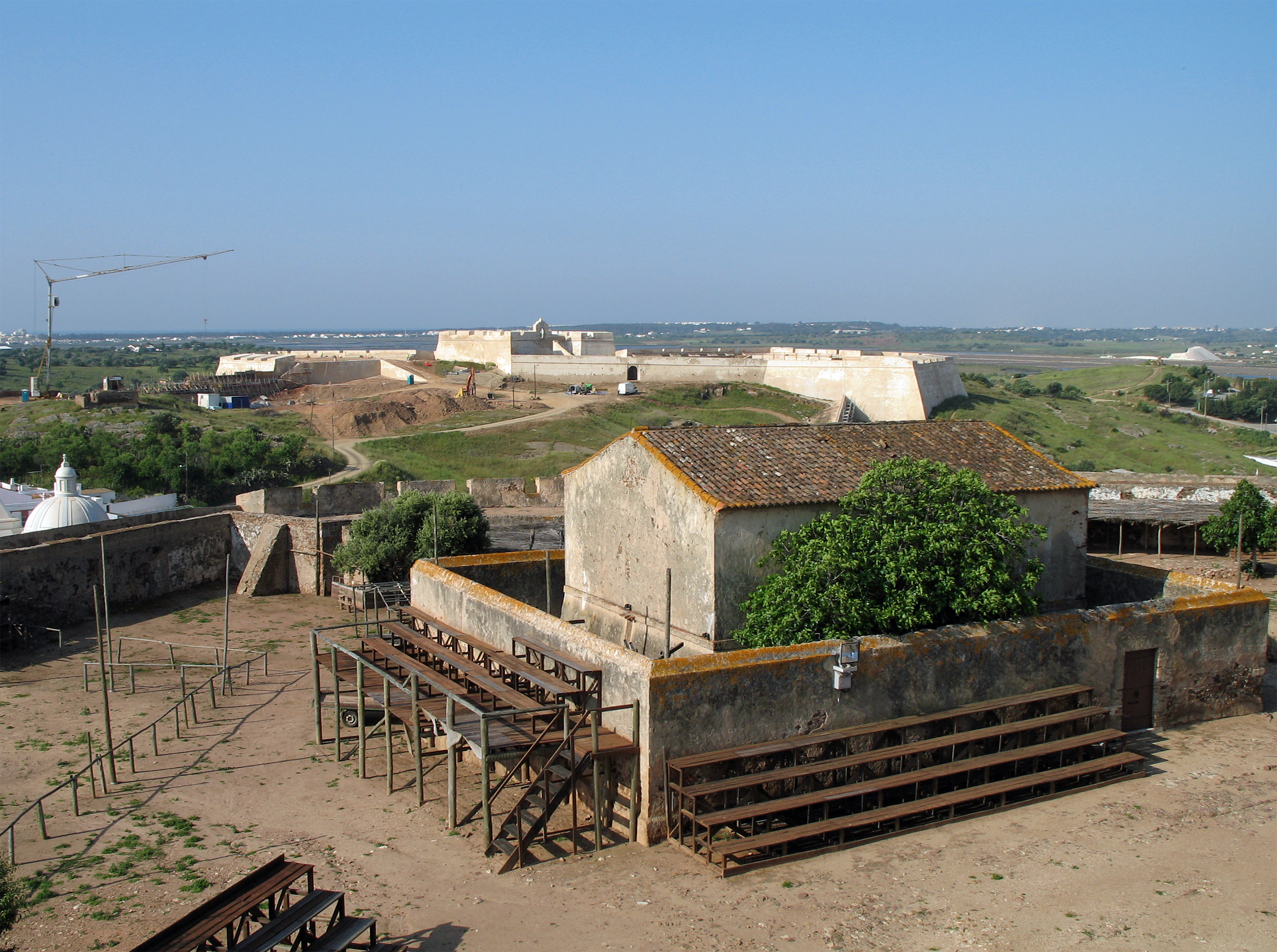

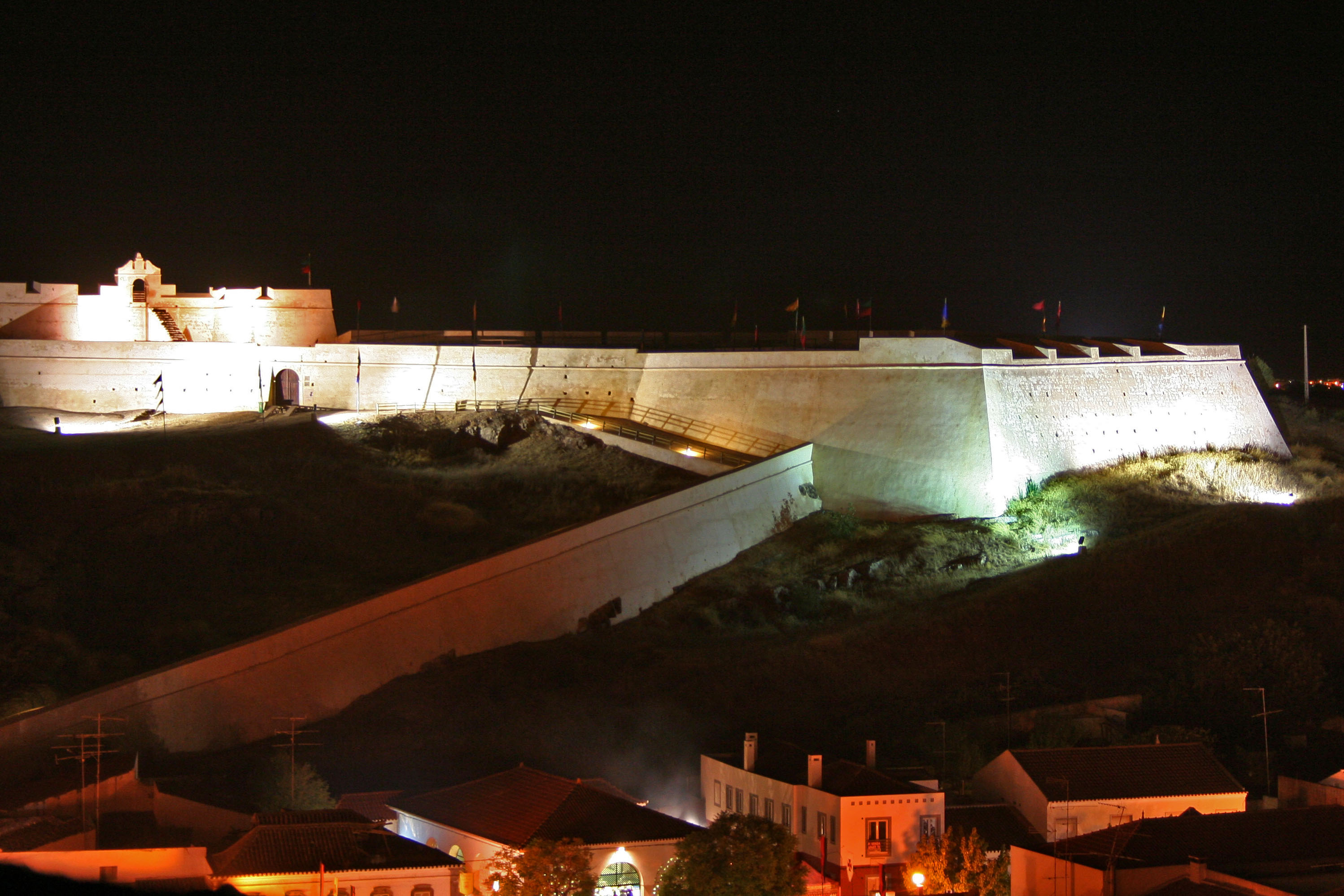

== See also ==
- Castle of Castro Marim
