= Altura (Castro Marim) =

- Civil parish
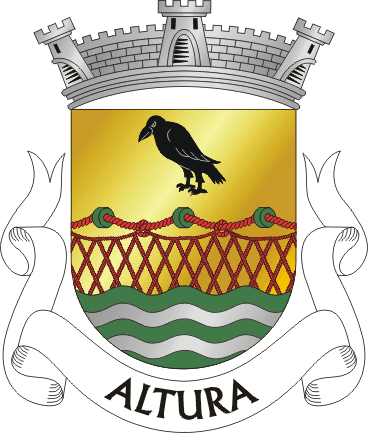
- Coat of arms

- Location in Portugal
- Coordinates: 37.180°N 7.503°W
- Country: Portugal
- Region: Algarve
- Intermunic. comm.: Algarve
- District: Faro
- Municipality: Castro Marim

Area
  - Total: 11.10 km^{2} (4.29 sq mi)

Population (2011)
  - Total: 2,195
  - Density: 197.7/km^{2} (512.2/sq mi)
- Time zone: UTC+00:00 (WET)
  - Summer (DST): UTC+01:00 (WEST)

Altura is a town and a civil parish in the municipality of Castro Marim, Algarve, Portugal. The population in 2011 was 2,195, in an area of 11.10 km^{2} (4.29 sq mi). It is a popular summer destination due to its beaches by the Atlantic Ocean. The civil parish of Altura was officially created on June 11, 1991, through detachment from the Castro Marim civil parish.

It includes the older and now defunct community of Alagoa.

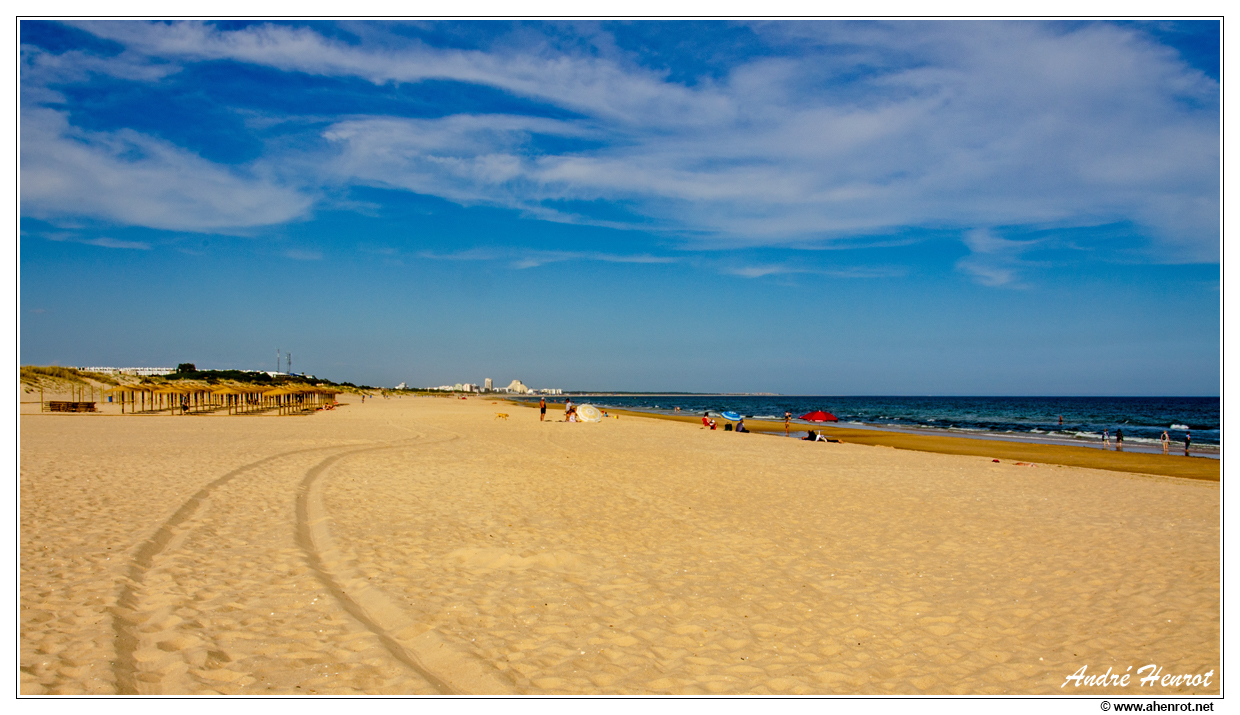
