= Ana Margarida Arruda =

Portuguese historian and archaeologist

Ana Margarida Costa Arruda dos Santos Gonçalves (born in 1955) is a Portuguese historian and archaeologist specialized in Phoenician-Punic archaeology.

== Biography ==
Ana Margarida Arruda graduated in History in 1978, from the Faculty of Letters of the University of Lisbon. She earned her PhD in Archaeology in 2000 from the same university, where she is working as researcher and professor since 1993. Arruda has collaborated with several universities including the Universidad Complutense of Madrid, the University of Seville or the University Pompeu i Fabra of Barcelona in Spain and the universities of Toulouse and of Paris 1 in France.

Arruda has participated and studied in depth most of the archaeological excavations related to the Phoenician colonisation of Portugal, like the former coastal sites of Santa Olaia, Abul, Alcaçova de Santarém, Castle of Castro Marim, Conímbriga, Setúbal, among others.

Arruda has demonstrated that the Phoenician presence in Portugal, mainly along its coast, started in the I millennium before Christ. She evidenced the greater antiquity of the archaeological sites of Santarém and Conímbriga with regard to the ones of Santa Olaia and Abul. She posits that the main interest of the Phoenicians for this region of the Iberian Peninsula was to develop trade, without discarding possible Phoenician interest for its native metallurgical technology. She do not discard the theory of the Spanish scholars Francisco José Moreno Arrastio and Fernando López Pardo that Phoenicians were also interested the slave trade. However she disagreed with the theory that agriculture was the main reason for the Phoenician colonisation of Portugal as proposed by Carlos González Wagner and Jaime Alvar Ezquerra.

== Bibliography ==
- Arruda, Ana Margarida (2000) – Los fenicios en Portugal: fenicios y mundo indígena en el centro y sur de Portugal. Barcelona: Cuadernos de Estudios Mediterráneos.
- Arruda, Ana Margarida (1988/89) – Conímbriga: Escavações de 1988–89. 1. Algumas precisões sobre a cronologia do "Bairro Indígena". Portugália. Porto: Instituto de Arqueologia da Faculdade de Letras de Universidade do Porto, Nova séria, 9-10, p. 93-100.
- Arruda, Ana Margarida (1993) – Conímbriga. In Medina, J. (Dir.) História de Portugal. Amadora: Ediclube, vol. 2, p. 263-274.
- Arruda, Ana Margarida (1997) – Conímbriga: fouilles de 1988–89. 2. Les travaux sur le Forum. In Itinéraires Lusitaniens. Trente années de collaboration archéologique luso-française. Bordéus: Diffusion E. de Boccard, p. 13- 33.
- Arruda, Ana Margarida (1988) – Nota acerca da ocupação romana républicana do Castelo de Castro Marim. In Actas do 5º Congresso sobre o Algarve (Montechorro,1988), vol I, Silves, Racal Clube, p 13–17.
- Arruda, Ana Margarida (1995) – Panorama das importações áticas em Portugal. Huelva Arqueológica (Actas do Simpósio: Iberos y Griegos: Lecturas desde la diversidad. Ampúrias, 1991). Huelva: Diputacion Provincial de Huelva, 13, 1, p. 129-154.
- Arruda, Ana Margarida (1996) – O Castelo de Castro Marim. In De Ulisses a Viriato. O Primeiro Milénio A.C. Lisboa: Museu Nacional de Arqueologia, p. 95-100.
- Arruda, Ana Margarida (1997) – As Cerâmicas Áticas do Castelo de Castro Marim. Lisboa, Colibri, p 109–145.
- Arruda, Ana Margarida (2000) - As cerâmicas de importação do Castelo de Castro Marim: no âmbito do comércio ocidental dos séculos V a II a.c.. In actas do IV Congresso Internacional de estudios Fenicios y Púnicos, Cadiz, Universidad de Cadiz, p. 727-735.
- Arruda, Ana Margarida (2001) - Importações púnicas no Algarve: cronologia e significado. In Os Púnicos no Extremo Ocidente (Actas do colóquio Internacional- Outubro de 2000). Lisboa: Universidade Aberta, p. 69-98.
- Arruda, Ana Margarida (2003) – A Idade do Ferro no Castelo de Castro Marim através das importações cerâmicas. Xelb (Actas do "Congresso Arqueologia no Algarve").Silves: Câmara Municipal de Silves, 4, p. 70-88.
- Arruda, Ana Margarida – Orientalizante e Pós-orientalizante no sudoeste peninsular: geografias e cronologias. In Actas do Congreso de Protohistoria del Mediterráneo Occidental. Mérida. Maio de 2003.
- Arruda, Ana Margarida – Os recursos marítimos na economia da Idade do Ferro do Sul de Portugal. In Actas da I Conferência Internacional sobre la historia de la pesca en el ámbito del estrecho.
- Arruda, Ana Margarida, Freitas, V. e Oliveira, C. - Os Fenícios e a urbanização no Extremo Ocidente: o caso de Castro Marim. Actas do III Colóquio del Internacional del centro de Estudios Fenicios y punicos: Las ciudades fenicio-punicas en el Mediterráneo Occidental. (en colab. Con Vera Teixeira de Freitas e Carlos Filipe Oliveira).
- Arruda, Ana Margarida, Viegas, C., Bargão, P. y Pereira, R. - Importação de preparados de peixe em Castro Marim: da Idade do Ferro à época romana. In Actas do colóquio internacional de Homenagem a Françoise Mayet.
