= Odeleite =

- Civil parish
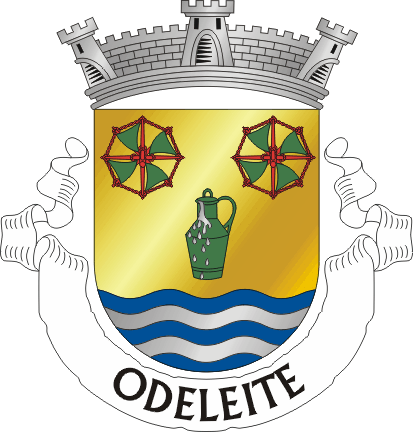
- Coat of arms

- Location in Portugal
- Coordinates: 37.334°N 7.487°W
- Country: Portugal
- Region: Algarve
- Intermunic. comm.: Algarve
- District: Faro
- Municipality: Castro Marim

Area
  - Total: 142.24 km^{2} (54.92 sq mi)

Population (2011)
  - Total: 763
  - Density: 5.36/km^{2} (13.9/sq mi)
- Time zone: UTC+00:00 (WET)
  - Summer (DST): UTC+01:00 (WEST)
- Website: https://www.junta.jf-odeleite.pt/

Odeleite is a freguesia (parish) in the municipality of Castro Marim (Algarve, Portugal). The population in 2011 was 763, in an area of 142.24 km^{2} (54.92 sq mi).
