= Azinhal (Castro Marim) =

- Civil parish
- Location in Portugal
- Coordinates: 37.285°N 7.465°W
- Country: Portugal
- Region: Algarve
- Intermunic. comm.: Algarve
- District: Faro
- Municipality: Castro Marim

Area
  - Total: 68.16 km^{2} (26.32 sq mi)

Population (2011)
  - Total: 522
  - Density: 7.66/km^{2} (19.8/sq mi)
- Time zone: UTC+00:00 (WET)
  - Summer (DST): UTC+01:00 (WEST)

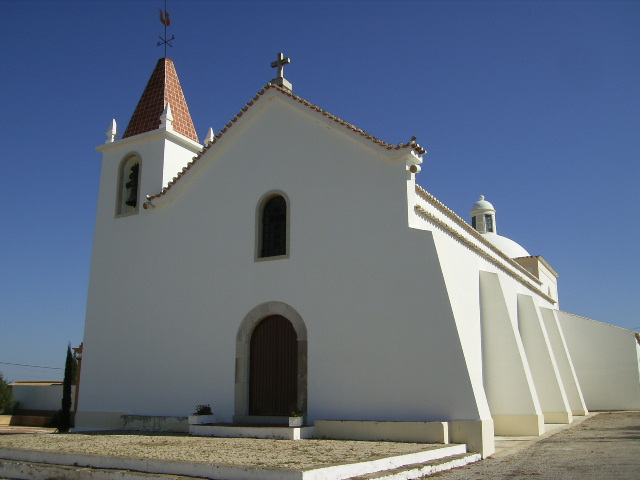
Azinhal main church

Azinhal is a freguesia (parish) in the municipality of Castro Marim (Algarve, Portugal). The population in 2011 was 522, in an area of 68.16 km^{2} (26.32 sq mi).
