= Castro Marim (parish) =

- Civil parish
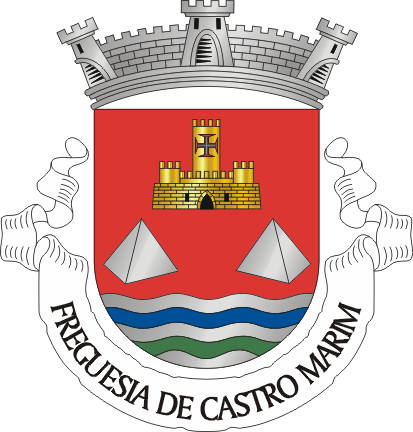
- Coat of arms

- Location in Portugal
- Coordinates: 37.217°N 7.443°W
- Country: Portugal
- Region: Algarve
- Intermunic. comm.: Algarve
- District: Faro
- Municipality: Castro Marim

Area
  - Total: 79.35 km^{2} (30.64 sq mi)

Population (2011)
  - Total: 3,267
  - Density: 41.17/km^{2} (106.6/sq mi)
- Time zone: UTC+00:00 (WET)
  - Summer (DST): UTC+01:00 (WEST)

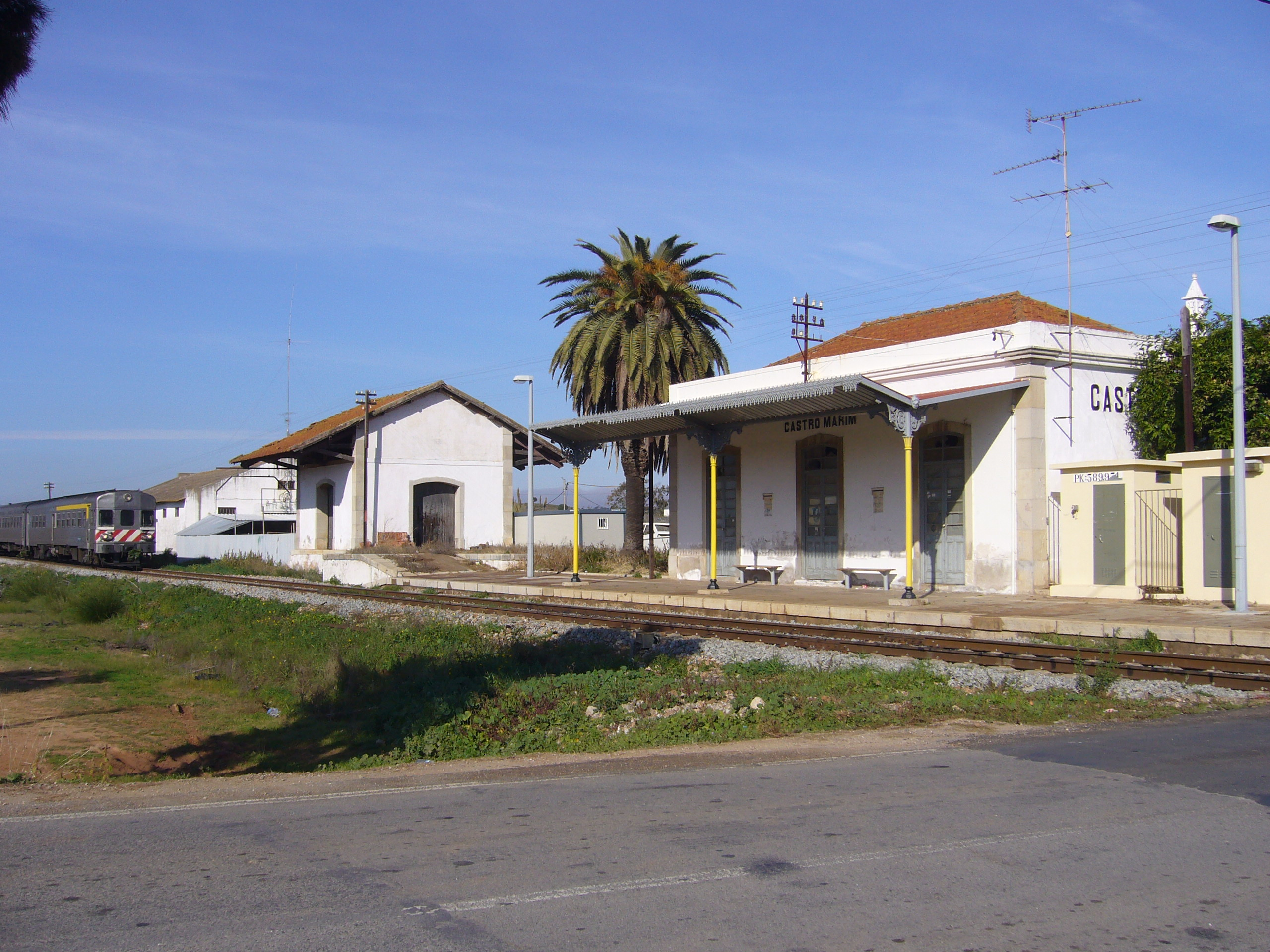
Castro Marim railway station

Castro Marim is a freguesia (parish) in Castro Marim Municipality (Algarve, Portugal). The population in 2011 was 3,267, in an area of 79.35 km^{2} (30.64 sq mi).

== Main sites ==
- Castro Marim Castle
- São Sebastião Fort
