= Castle of Castro Marim =

Medieval castle in Algarve, Portugal

- Castelo de Castro Marim
- Faro, Algarve, Algarve in Portugal
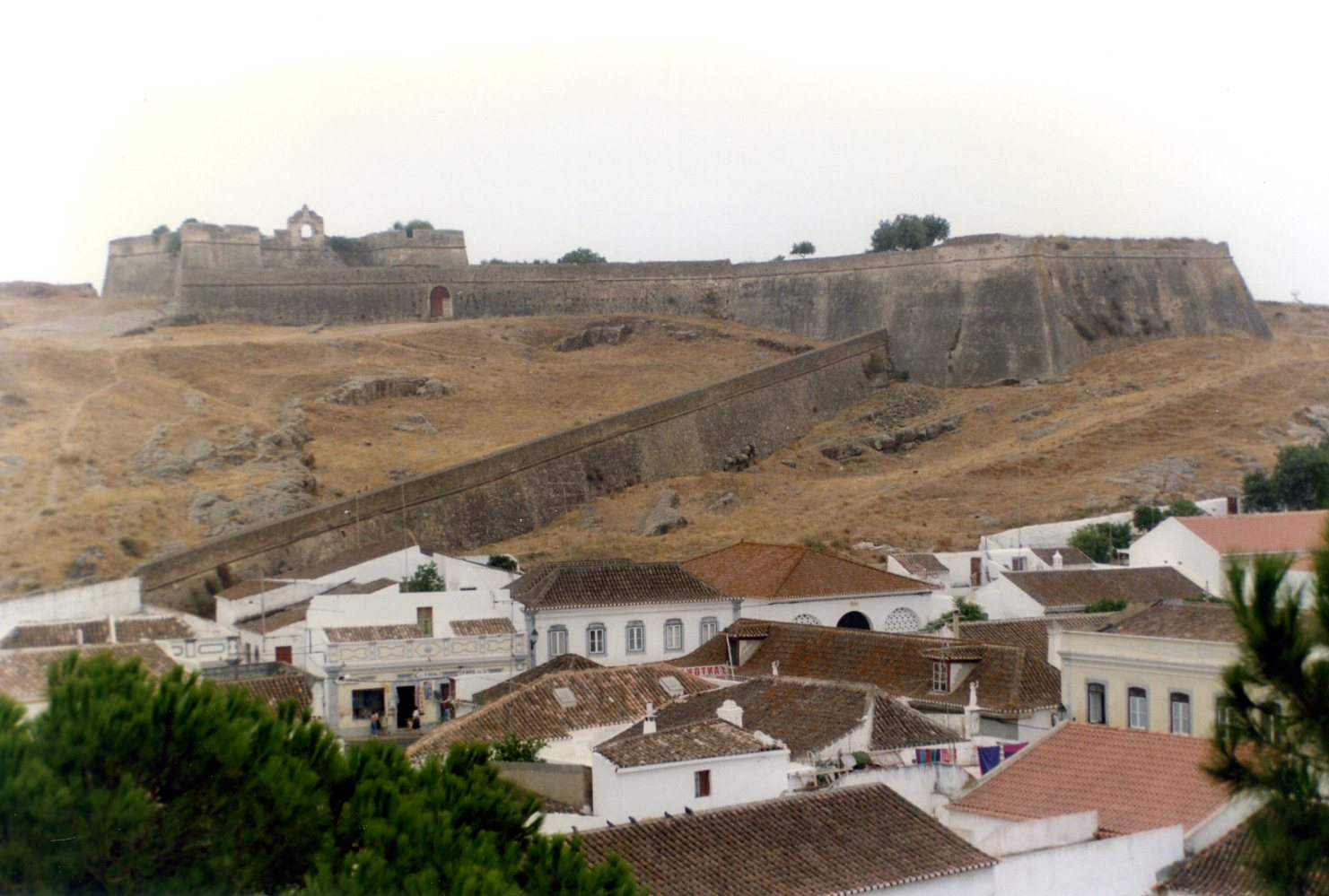
- The barren and sparse façade of the Castle overlooking the parish of the same name

Site information
- Type: Castle
- Owner: Portuguese Republic
- Operator: Núcleo Museológico do Castelo de Castro Marim
- Open to the public: Public

Location
- Coordinates: 37°13′6.69″N 7°26′31″W

Site history
- Built: 854 BCE
- Materials: Stonework, Masonry (limestone and red shale), Plaster, Wood, Tile

The Castle of Castro Marim is a medieval castle on a hilltop overlooking the civil parish of Castro Marim, in the municipality of the same name, in the Portuguese Algarve. The castle was part of the defensive line controlled by the Knights Templar, a stronghold used during the Portuguese Reconquista, and adapted during the Restoration War to defend the frontier.

The castle is located in a unique landscape due to the proximity of salt and mouth of the Guadiana River. Within the castle fortification are two epigraphic inscriptions: one, the first to record a settlement established by a Portuguese monarch, while the second carving identifies the alterations occurring under the reign of King Denis.

== History ==
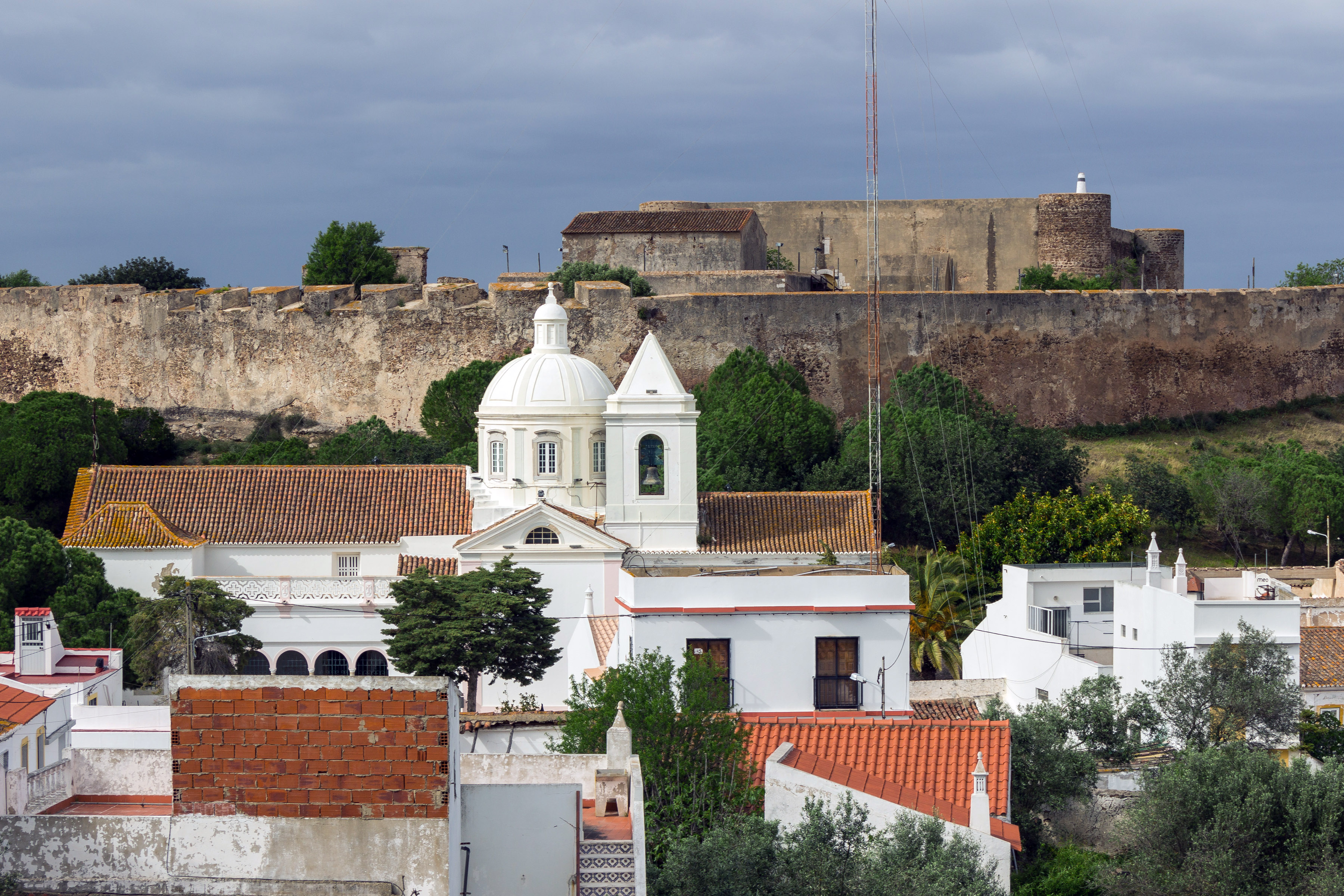
The castle's profile overlooking the parish of Castro Marim

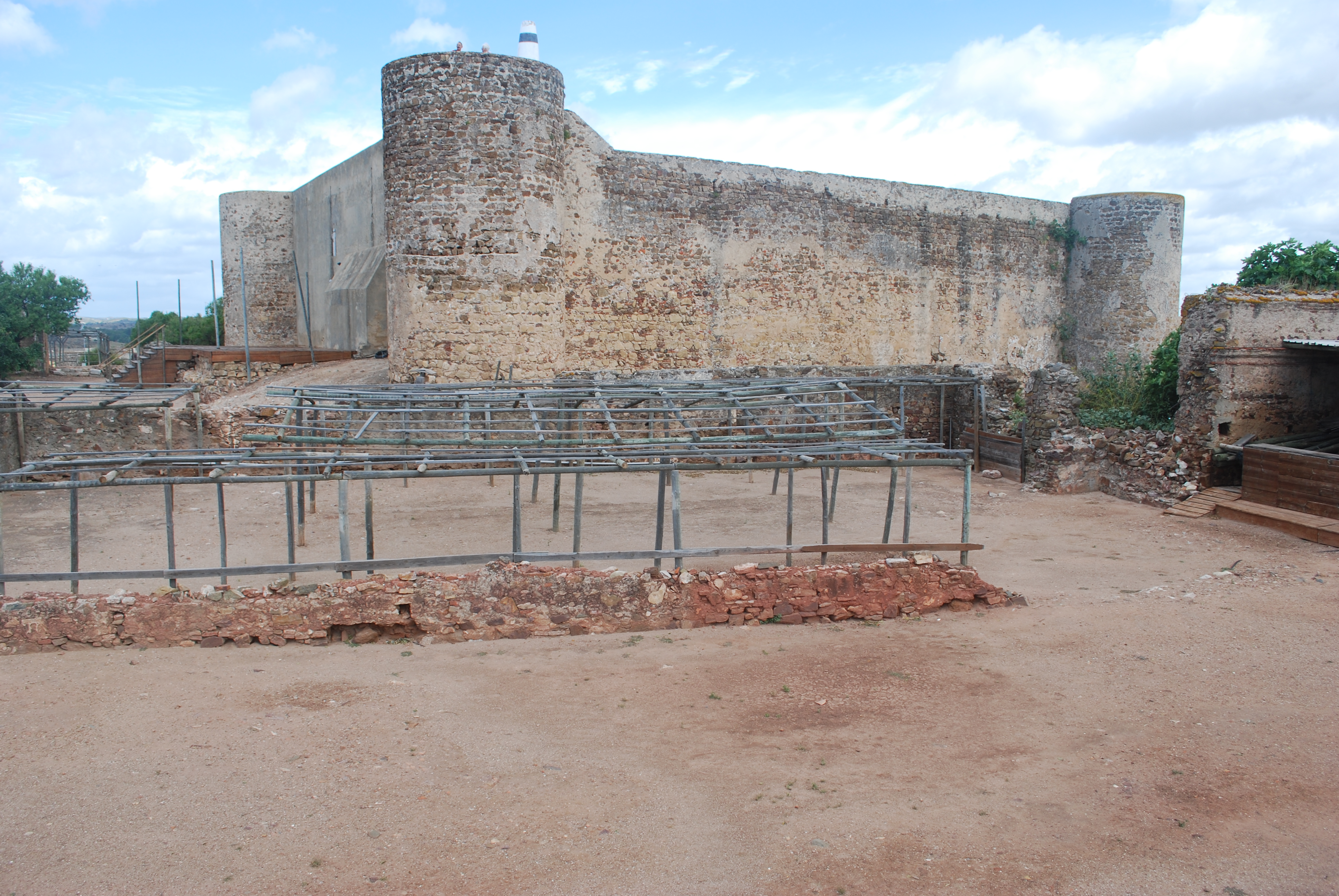
The interior keep showing the cylinderal towers

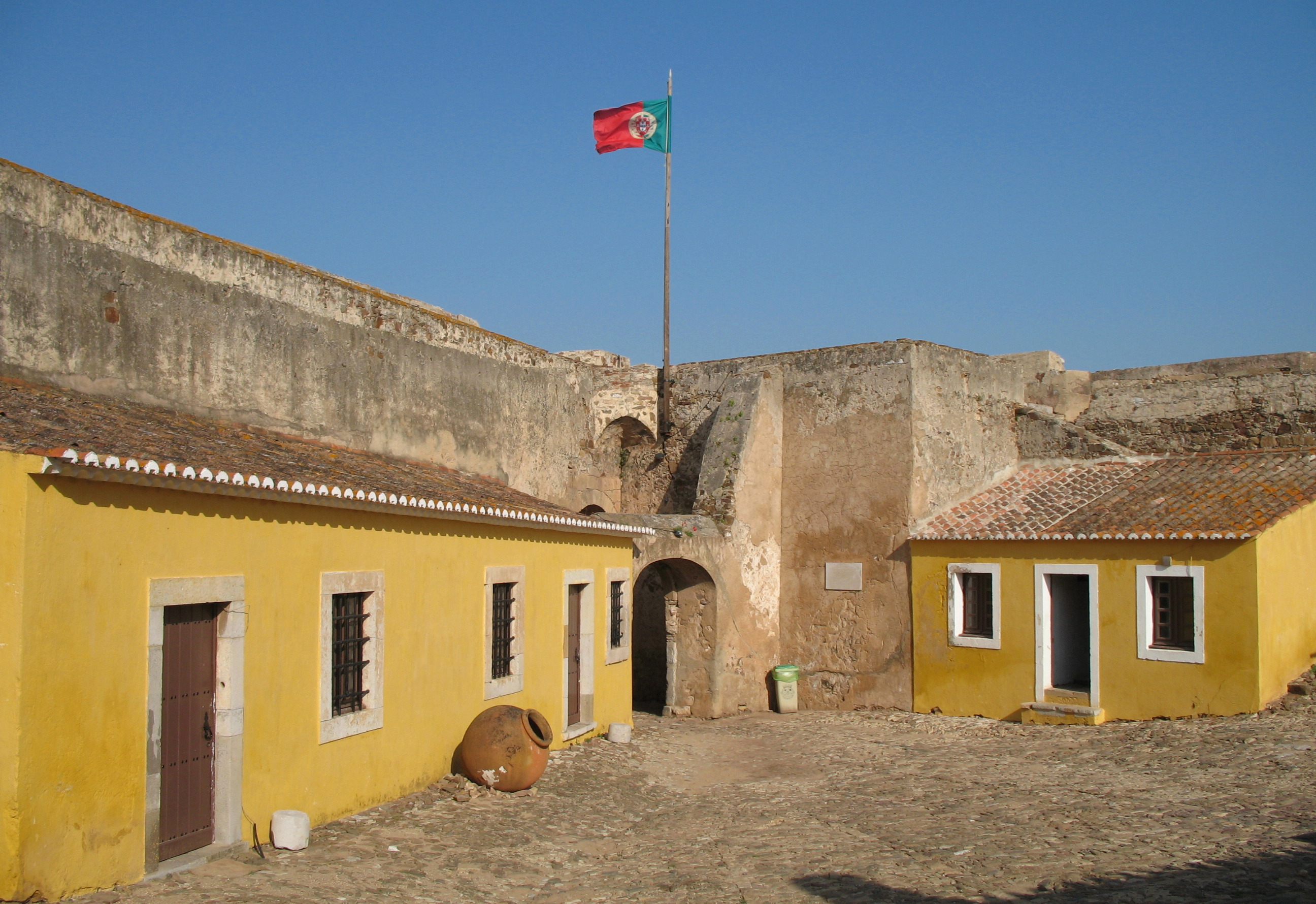
Part of the restored interior dependencies along the keep walls

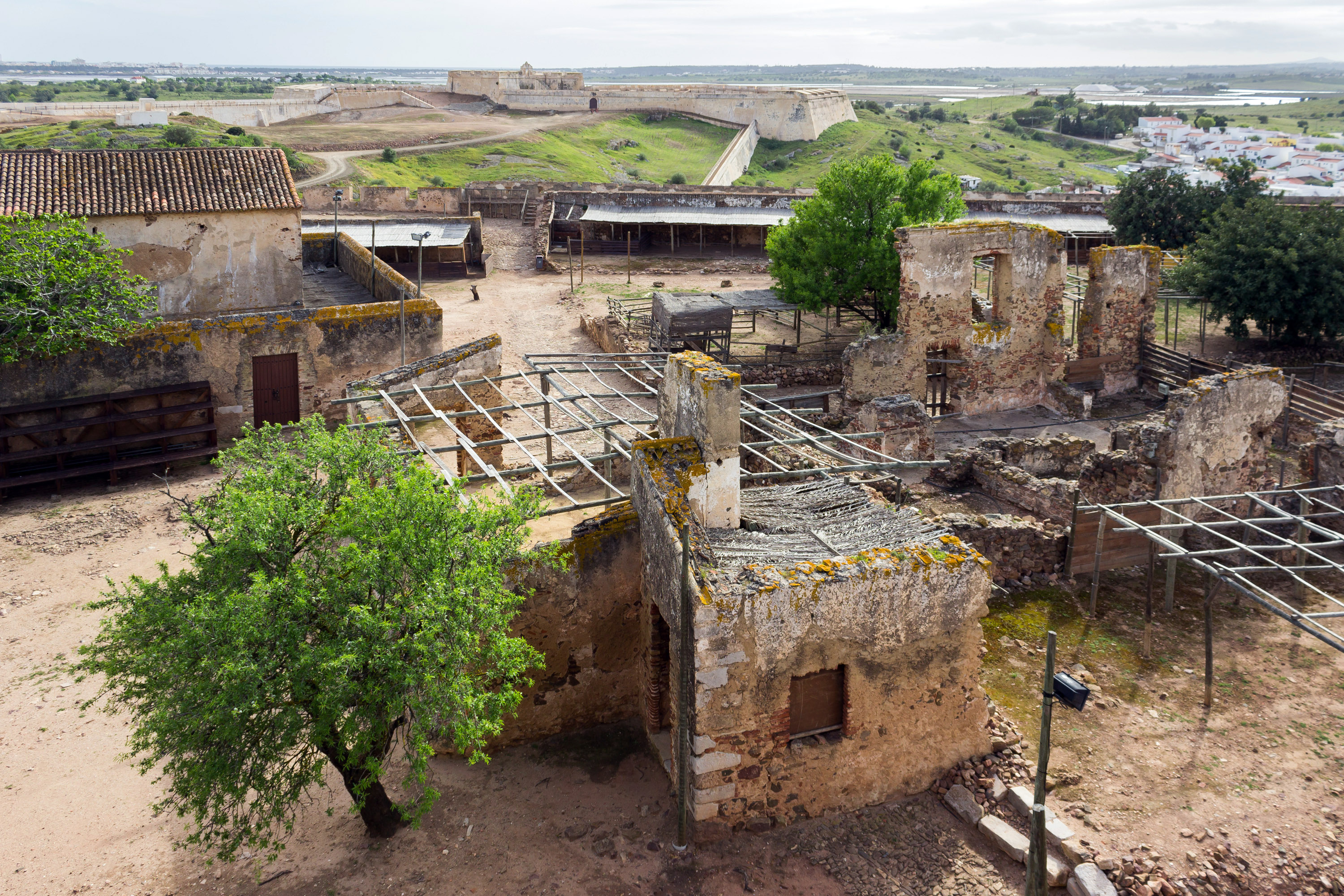
Another fragment of the interior seen from a keep wall

In the vicinity of the fortress there must have existed a castro, dating to the Neolithic period, and successively occupied by Phoenicians, Greeks (854 BC) and Carthaginians (at the end of the 4th century BC). This settlement was finally destroyed in a major cataclysm, before the arrival of the Romans. Following their arrival, the fortification was reconstructed and began occupying an important regional position economically and politically, extending into the Moorish occupation.

Throughout the decade of 1230, the Portuguese Reconquista of the eastern Algarve, by forces of the Order of Santiago, created an influx of settlers into the region of Castro Marim. In 1238, King Sancho II of Portugal captured the mouth of the Guadiana River, which laid the scene for the definitive capture of Castro Marim in 1242, by Paio Peres Correia. Its place along the former Arab-Christian divide meant that settlement by Christians remained weak, resulting in the initiatives in 1274 by King Afonso III of Portugal to populate the settlement of Castro Marim. On 8 July 1277, a foral charter was issued by the King in order to create incentives to settlement, at the same time ordering the reconstruction of the fortress.

During the last quarter of the 13th century, King Denis of Portugal compensating for the loss of Ayamonte to Castile, reinforced the fortifications of Castro Marim, then referred to as Castelo Velho (Old Castle), and then constructed the Castelo de Fora (the barbican) to defend the population of the settlement. On 1 July 1279, the replacement or construction of the castle gate began: it was one of the first public works begun under the reign of King Denis (from an inscription located on the site). This project was part of the larger expansion of Portuguese control, conferred officially on 1 May 1282, when the King issued an expanded foral decree (charter) for Castro Marim and its surroundings.

In a papal bull issued by Pope John XXII, on 14 March 1319, Castro Marim (which was part of the bishopric of Silves), was donated to the recently created Military Order of Christ, establishing its first headquarters in Castro Marim because the "castle is very strong and has a favorable defensive place, which is on the frontier with other known enemies". In 1334, the Order's headquarters moved to Tomar, resulting in the castle's abandon, but the settlement's administration was transferred to the Order of Santiago, who began constructing the Church of Santiago within the castle's square.

On 10 April 1421, King John I authorized the settlement of 40 malcontents, in order to expand the population and promote settlement.

In April 1453, King Afonso V visited the castle and issued decrees to regulate the fishing in the settlement.

On 20 August 1504, a new foral was issued by King Manuel I who ordered the restoration of the fortifications, including the walls of the castle. Designs were executed in 1509-1510, by Duarte de Armas, with several modernized barbicans (a missing or destroyed merlons) and irregular plant, that accompanied the topography of the region and encompassed the village. In the eastern corner was a rectangular tower lined with merlons and accessed by a large gate with arched door; to the west was a smaller tower, but with a gate surmounted by a sculpted coat-of-arms (with main shield and five smaller shields); in the north, was a small arch close to the ground for sewage, flanked by barbicans; and to the north, the rectangular castle was constructed with cylindrical towers in each corner, surmounted by merlons and crowned by a conical wood structure (likely ceiling beams with tile); the southern aspect also included a cell block/tower, with low rectangular bulwark and two levels of windows. The keep consisted of a rectangular bulwark, with a false portico, protected by low body protruding from the wall, devoid of merlons. In the interior of the fortress's longitudinal courtyard were various shelters, including a chapel and two cisterns. Within the historic town walls were visible the two- to three-storey houses, a chapel with a double belfrey, with a few homes to the east and west.

In 1600, Henrique Fernandes Sarrão wrote that the castle had "three gates within the impenetrable castle, that was rebuilt from scratch, with a tall tower". With the Restoration War, the fortress was remodelled around 1640 with a bulwark, and concluded during the reign of King Afonso VI. The region's defenses were divided between this castle and the Fort of São Sebastião and the Revelim of Santo António.

The 1755 Lisbon earthquake caused the razing of the old town within the walls of the castle, resulting in its reconstruction outside the walls. The damage extended to the Church of Santiago, which was completely ruined, resulting in its transfer to the Hermitage of Nossa Senhora dos Mártires, while the castle was ordered reconstructed by King Joseph.

The Direcção Geral dos Edifícios e Monumentos Nacionais first intervened between 1942 and 1952 in the castle's recuperation, that included the reconstruction and consolidation of the masonry walls; repair of the staircases and corners; and reconstruction of the roofs and ceilings in wood, as well as the repair and painting of the altars. Six years later they were re-touching the interiors and exteriors, with the construction of the drainage walls near the hermitage.

In 1960 the spaces were adapted for a museum, which included further repairs to the walls, reconstruction of the vaulted ceilings and arches, repairs to the capitals and columns, in addition to the construction of the Portuguese-style pavement.

By 28 February 1969, the castle suffered the effects of a new earthquake.

The gradual consolidation of various constructions in the interior of the castle began in 1977, that included the restoration of the powder magazine and the Renaissance-era chapel, but also the execution of public works to repair the masonry and repair the ceiling tiles. The continuation of the fortress' repairs extended into 1978, with the demolition of the masonry that harmed the interior of the chapel and later repairs to the masonry walls: the same repairs were repeated in 1979, 1980, 1982 and 1983.

Between 2000 and November 2003, the archeologist Ana Margarida Arruda undertook a series of excavations within the limits of the castle.

Between 2007 and 2008 the local authority approved a budget of six million Euros destined for the re-qualification and consolidation of the castle and fortress.

== Architecture ==
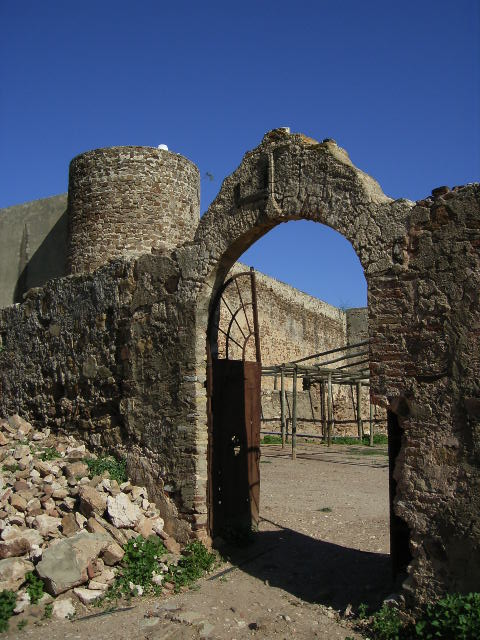
The lateral entrance to the barbican

The castle is located in an urban context, implanted harmoniously on a geological platform overlooking the limits of the town of Castro Marim, on the eastern margin of the Guadiana River and integrated into the Marsh Nature Reserve of Castro Marim. Within the walled perimeter of the fortress is the Church of Santiago and behind a veil of walls, the Fort of São Sebastião.

The outer fortification of the city is in the form of an irregular triangle, encircled by a battlement with merlons, on the south by a platform, and two low rectangular towers on the east and west (both covered by terraces with simple doors). The latter tower doorway is surmounted by historical coat-of-arms of Portugal and inscription. The commemorative inscription marked the settlement of Castro Marim by King Afonso III was carved onto sandstone, with the coat-of-arms sculpted in relief, showing five castles, four shields forming a cross. The 1274 carvings are well worn, with the Caroline-Gothic inscription stating: "ERA M CCC XII POPULAVIT CASTRUM MARINUS REX ALFONSUS PORTUGAL ET ALGARBI ET STI...".

On the north wall, is the old castle, a trapezoid or semi-rectangular enclosure plan, encircled by merlons and four cylindrical towers on each corner. To the north and south are arch doorways, one with a coat-of-arms and inscription.

In the interior there are two-storey buildings to the west and north, with rectangular doors and windows, and to the east by the ruins of the square and dependencies). Along the exterior, on the south wall, are vestiges of a keep dominated by bulwarks. In the community are a few visible structures and ruins of rectangular laneways, one with an arch. The commemorative inscription marks the start of construction of the castle, framed by simple filleted frame and surmounted by a shield composed of three escutcheons (similar to the one encountered on the barbican). Comparable to the sandstone coat-of-arms in the entrance, the 1279 inscription "ERA Mª CCCª XVII SABADO PRIMO DIA DE JULHO FOI ESTA PORTA E...MADA EM T[EM]PO DE REY D[OM] DINIS ERA COM...REINAR XVII DIA[S DE FEVEREIRO]."

== See also ==
- List of castles in Portugal
- Castles in Portugal
- Monuments of Portugal
- History of Portugal
