= Castro Marim =

- Municipality
- Town of Castro Marim
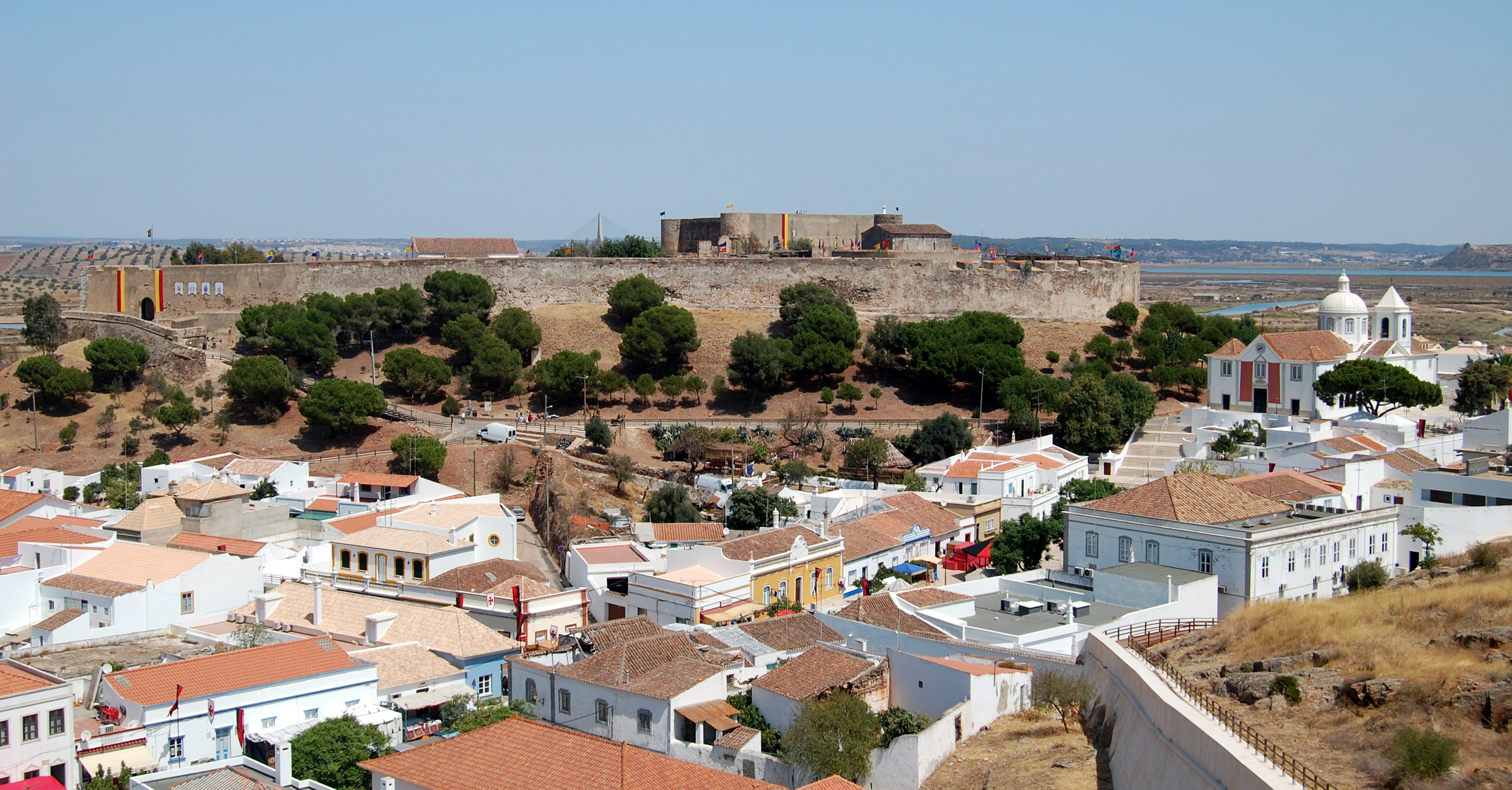
- View of Castro Marim

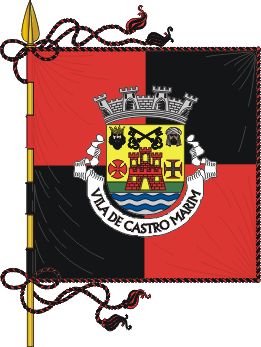
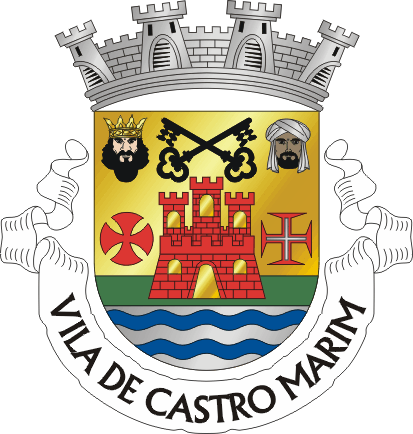
- Flag Coat of arms
- Interactive map of Castro Marim
- Location in Portugal
- Coordinates: 37°13′N 7°27′W
- Country: Portugal
- Region: Algarve
- Intermunic. comm.: Algarve
- District: Faro
- Parishes: 4

Government
  - President: Francisco Amaral (PSD)

Area
  - Total: 300.84 km^{2} (116.15 sq mi)

Population (2011)
  - Total: 6,747
  - Density: 22.43/km^{2} (58.09/sq mi)
- Time zone: UTC+00:00 (WET)
  - Summer (DST): UTC+01:00 (WEST)
- Local holiday: June 24
- Website: http://www.cm-castromarim.pt

Castro Marim (Portuguese pronunciation: [ˈkaʃtɾu mɐˈɾĩ]), officially the Town of Castro Marim (Portuguese: Vila de Castro Marim), is a town and a municipality in the southern region of Algarve, in Portugal. The population in 2011 was 6,747, in an area of 300.84 km^{2}.

The current mayor is Francisco Amaral, elected by the Social Democratic Party.

The municipal holiday is June 24.

In the Roman era, Castro Marim was known as Aesuris.

Every year at the end of August there is a Medieval Fair/Festival that reunites many people from across the world to perform, like medieval musicians, archers, swordsmen, dancers, troupes, et cetera. There are sellers too: blacksmiths, textile crafters (weaving), herbs sellers, and so on.

In honour of his Portuguese mother, Lucia Gomes, from Castro Marim, the Spanish composer and guitarist Paco de Lucía named his thirteenth studio album Castro Marín.

== Parishes ==
Administratively, the municipality is divided into 4 civil parishes (freguesias):

- Altura
- Azinhal
- Castro Marim
- Odeleite

== Notable people ==
- Domingos Correia Arouca (1790–1861) a general, administrator and colonial governor of Cape Verde, 1835-1837

== See also ==
- Fort São Sebastião (Castro Marim)
