= Translations of Ulysses =

Translations of 1922 novel

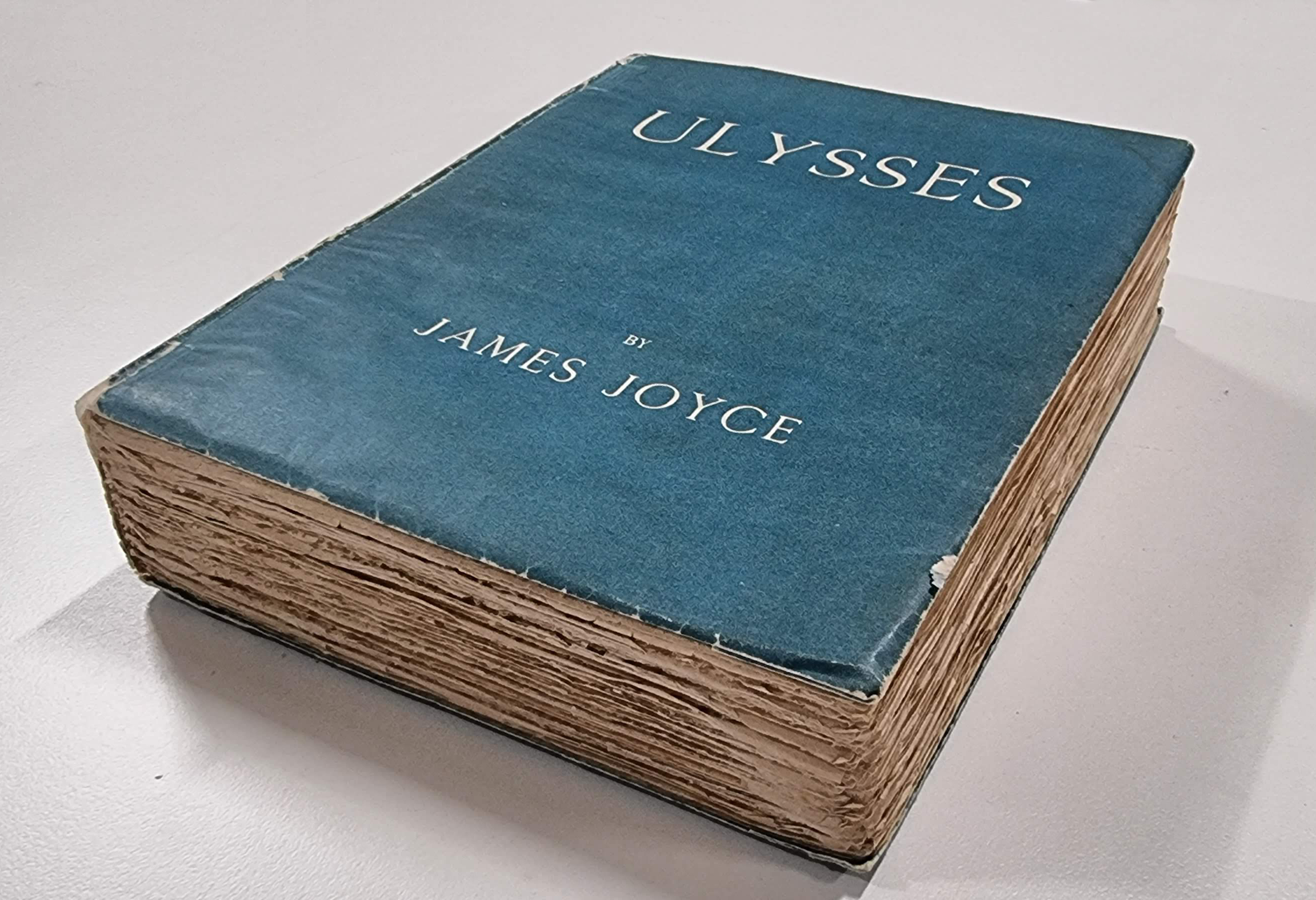
First edition, 1922

James Joyce's novel Ulysses (1922) has been translated into at least 45 languages. Published in English and set in Dublin, the novel is renowned for its linguistic complexity, use of multiple literary styles, extensive wordplay, and dense cultural references that present exceptional challenges for translators. The first translations appeared during Joyce's lifetime: German (1927), French (1929), Czech (1930), and Japanese (1931). Joyce was personally involved in the French translation. Several languages have multiple translations, with Italian having nine versions and Portuguese six.

The translation history of Ulysses reflects broader political and cultural dynamics. In some countries, translations were suppressed by censorship or translators faced persecution (Soviet Russia); elsewhere, translations became significant cultural events (Sweden, Hungary) or political statements about the status of minority languages (Kurdish, Basque, Irish). Translators have taken diverse approaches, from prioritizing readability to maintaining the original's linguistic complexity. Particularly challenging elements include Joyce's use of different English dialects, untranslatable wordplay, and the "Oxen of the Sun" chapter, which parodies the evolution of English prose styles from Anglo-Saxon to contemporary slang. Translation teams, retranslations, and scholarly revisions have continued into the 21st century.

== The language of Ulysses and issues with its translation ==
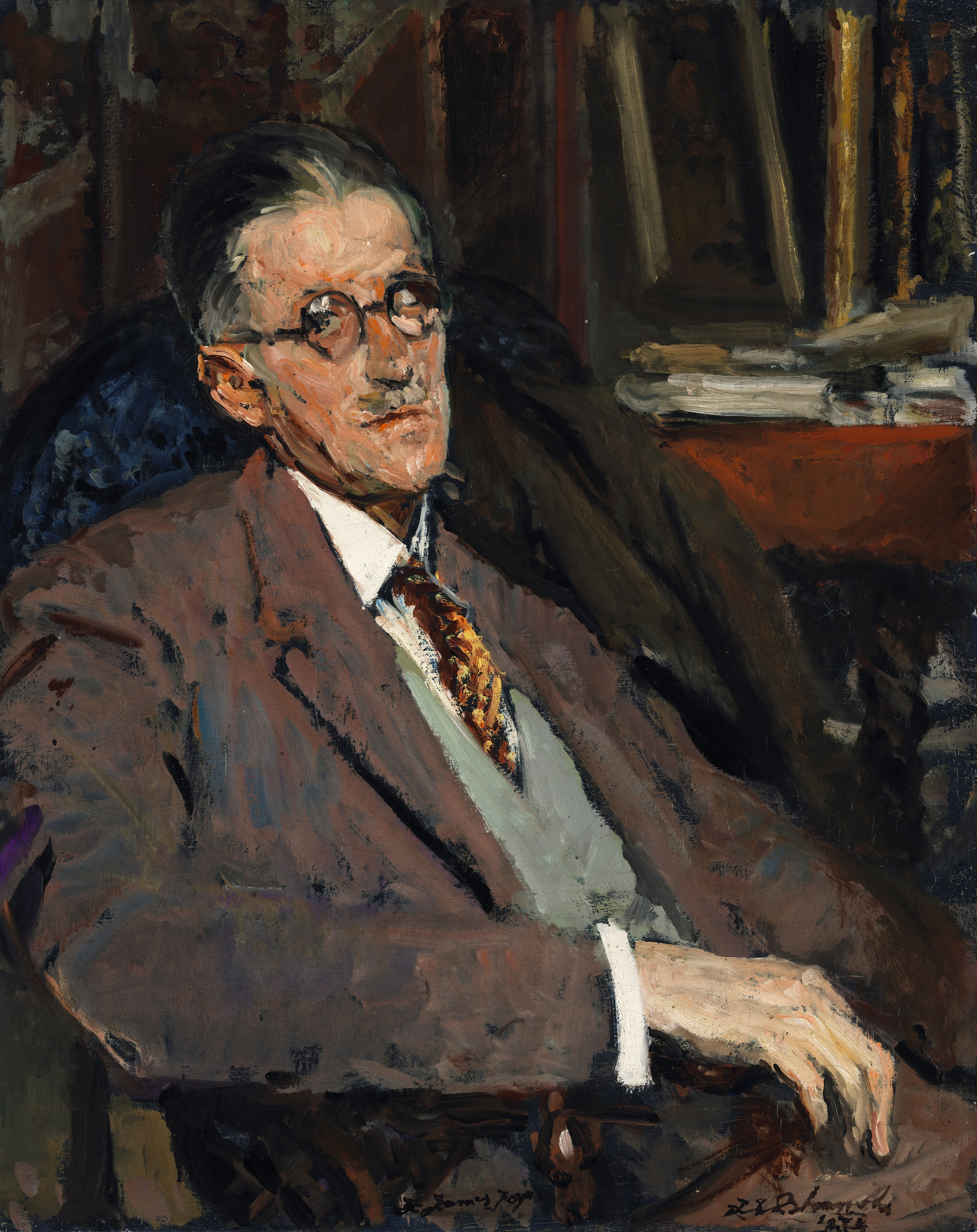
Portrait of James Joyce, 1934

Ulysses, published in 1922, was translated into multiple languages, and was called to be one of the hardest books to translate. Several translators called it an "untranslatable" book, a "horror" to translate, and wrote about its "unretranslatability".

The demand that I make of my reader is that he should devote his whole life to reading my works.
—James Joyce

The joke that Ulysses needs translation even into English suggests that outside of Finnegans Wake (where it's too dark to read), Ulysses is one of the toughest gigs there is for a translator.
—Keri Walsh

Zlatko Gorjan, the translator of the book into Croatian, wrote:

I do not believe that a truly adequate translation is possible. And I fail to understand why writers and critics – and the reading public, too – argue so much about the idea of an absolutely faithful translation.
—"On Translating Joyce's Ulysses", 1971

The Joyce scholar Fritz Senn compared the task of translation with heroic deeds of Odysseus:

A translator who undertakes so exacting a venture is embarking upon a veritable odyssee himself. ... He needs the skill, the resourcefulness of Odysseus himself as well as his perseverance and, if possible, some help from a kindly disposed goddess of wisdom-which is more than some of us commentators could be called ... Some of the gods will side against him and constant sacrifices will never quite appease them. Many storms will have to be weathered, dangerous rocks evaded and whirlpools steered by, temptations lurk on strange islands, formidable giants must be overcome, foreign linguistic shores will have to be touched and averse winds blow little good to anybody. The losses, at any rate, will be heavy and the voyager who reaches the strand of his native Ithaca with at least some of the crew and of the cargo in safety is to account himself lucky.
—"Seven against "Ulysses"", 1967

In Joyce's lifetime, only four translations were made: German (1927), French (1929), Czech (1930) and Japanese (1931). Joyce was always interested in translations, and "felt extremely 'delighted' to read translations of Ulysses in other languages".

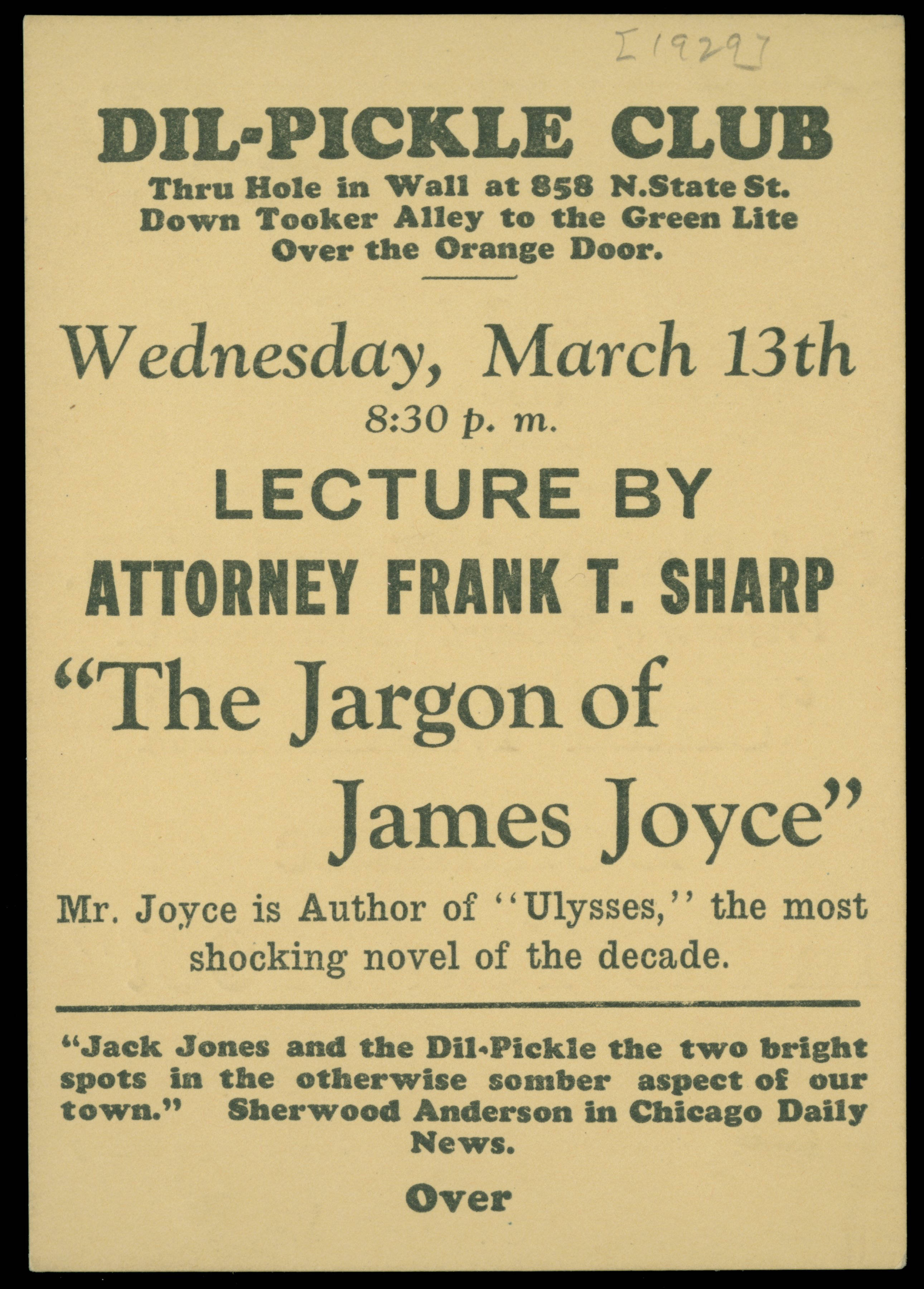
Frank T. Sharp lectured in Chicago on "The Jargon of James Joyce", 1929

Joyce's English is extremely non-standard; he used words from many languages, that was called by one translator "the 'fearful jumble' of dialectal versions, cant, and pidgins". His language is "both defamiliarized and foreignized through the introduction of a wealth of foreign terms and idioms, its diachronic and synchronic expanse navigated". Joyce used Irish English and Hebrew words and phrases.

One of the most convoluted chapters of the book is "Oxen of the Sun", in which Joyce parodies the evolution of English prose:

One of the most notoriously untranslatable parts of Ulysses is the "Oxen" Coda that Joyce himself described as a "frightful jumble of Pidgin English, nigger English, Cockney, Irish, Bowery slang and broken doggerel" (Letters I 140). This poly-cacophony relies on a continuous switching of dialects, codes, substandards and pidgins, often within the same phrase; the sources of the entries in the Oxen Notesheet 17, identified by Chrissie van Mierlo, range from a 1902 edition of a dictionary of London cant and slangs, Suffolk and American East Coast sea slang, to the parlances of the American frontier and of diverse immigrant groups, mostly pilfered from Bret Harte's 1902 Tales of the West, especially his parody of J.F. Cooper, the source of much caricature Native American, Black American, and Chinese American speech.

According to the so-called "retranslation hypothesis", retranslations tend to be closer to the original text than previous translations. It was observed, for example, in Swedish, but not in Croatian and Catalan translations.

Cait Murphy shows an example of just one Joyce's wordplay that poses a challenge to translate:

Another example: Stephen recalls that he has borrowed a pound from the poet and writer George Russell, who styles himself "A.E." Thinking of his debt, Stephen puns "A.E.I.O.U." In the German, Italian, Czech, and Latvian translations, the expression is simply left as it is, which must be rather baffling to readers. Most others include a native-language gloss. In the 1929 French translation the passage reads "A.E. Je vous dois. I.O.U." In Spanish it is "A.E. Te debo. I.O.U." In Hungarian the vowels are changed, killing the joke: "A.E.K.P." The same is true in Croatian, where an explanation is also added: "A.E.J.V.D (Ja vam dugujem)."

== Overview ==
Ulysses has been translated into at least 45 languages. Several languages have more than one translation, for example Italian has nine, while Portuguese has six. In some countries, translations by already well-known writers and poets became known as "classic" and gained cult-like status (see German, French, Swedish, Hungarian, Finnish); in some, sparked discussions about Joyce or the translation (see Russian and Dutch); while in some countries translations were met with indifference (see Armenian, Latvian, and Belarusian); in some, translations were heavily advertised and became a cultural event (see second Swedish). Some translators did the work because of the love to Ulysses (see Danish), while for some it was a political statement about the merits of their "minor" languages (see Kurdish, Basque, Irish, Belarusian, Galician).

Translations can be unevenly divided into "early", that were done during Joyce's life (first translations into German, French, Japanese, and Czech), and "late", which benefited from amassed critical materials about the book, and often were translated from the revised editions (see Icelandic and Chinese). In several countries the publication of translation was almost impossible because of censorship: translators were arrested and executed (see Russian), the book itself was censored by omitting multiple scenes (see early Japanese, Romanian), was published abroad (see Latvian, Belarusian, Kurdish, second Arabic, Persian), or was not published before the regime's change (see Russian, Ukrainian). Multiple translators worked from exile (see Kurdish, second Arabic, Persian). In case of retranslations, younger translators often harshly criticized their predecessors (see Hungarian, Dutch, Brazilian Portuguese). Multiple translators were amateurs with no prior experience in translation or literature (see Spanish, Russian, Belarusian, Greek, Italian), though some were done by already famous writers or poets (see Czech, first Finnish, second German, Japanese, second Hungarian, Armenian). Some translations were done by teams (see French, Japanese, Flemish Dutch, Galician, the latest Brazilian Portuguese). Very few women translated the book (see Bulgarian, Macedonian, second Brazilian Portuguese). Some translations were done in just half a year (see Catalan, Finnish), while some translators worked on it for years (the longest one was Danish, that took it translator 18 years; the same translator then continued to work on the retranslation).

List of languages

Language (year of the first (full) published translation, number of translations)

1. German (1927, 2)
2. French (1929, 2)
3. Czech (1930, 2)
4. Japanese (1931, 4)
5. Swedish (1943, 2)
6. Spanish (1945, 5)
  1. Argentinian (1945, 2)
  2. European (1976, 3)
7. Hungarian (1947, 2)
8. Danish (1949, 3)
9. Serbo-Croatian (1957, 3)
  1. Croatian (1957, 2)
  2. Serbian (2001)
10. Italian (1960, 9)
11. Latvian (1960)
12. Finnish (1964, 2)
13. Portuguese (1966, 6)
  1. Brazilian (1966, 4)
  2. European (1984, 2)
14. Korean (1968, 3)
15. Slovene (1968)
16. Greek (1969, 2)
17. Dutch (1969, 3)
18. Polish (1969, 2)
19. Catalan (1981, 2 + 1 unpublished)
20. Arabic (1982, 2 + chapters)
21. Romanian (1984, 2)
22. Hebrew (1985)
23. Belarusian (1988)
24. Russian (1989 + chapters)
25. Irish (1991)
26. Icelandic (1992)
27. Norwegian (1993)
28. Slovak (1993)
29. Chinese (1994, 3)
30. Turkish (1996, 2)
31. Georgian (1999)
32. Albanian (2003)
33. Lithuanian (2003 + chapters)
34. Bulgarian (2004)
35. Uzbek language (2008)
36. Mongolian (2009)
37. Armenian (2012)
38. Macedonian (2012)
39. Malayalam (2012 + chapters)
40. Galician (2013)
41. Basque (2015)
42. Ukrainian (2015)
43. Persian (2019)
44. Kurdish (2023)
45. Estonian (2024)
- Italic year means that only part of the book was translated and published.

== Early translations ==
=== German ===
The first German translation by Georg Goyert was published as a three-volume edition in 1927. Though Goyert had access to Joyce for consultation, he apparently made limited use of this opportunity. A revised version of his translation appeared in 1930 in two volumes, though both editions remained expensive. The translation was called "badly botched", and Goyert's "approach was clearly in keeping with the attempts by the publishers to suggest that the German Ulysses was an expensive, well-bound, well-printed piece of pornography." In the 1930 revised edition more than 6000 changes were made.

In the mid-1960s, Suhrkamp Verlag acquired the rights and commissioned Hans Wollschläger to translate Ulysses as part of their complete Joyce works edition, under Klaus Reichert's editorship. The book was published in 1976 and became known as the "translation of the century" and "instant classic". Wollschläger was known as a "recluse genius" who never worked in a team.

After Wollschläger's death, the project to revise the translation was started. In a decade, it "effectively overhauled, mainly with the aim of factual accuracy and internal consistency". It was led by Harald Beck together with Ruth Frehner and Ursula Zeller. Though the work was completed, the publisher failed to secure right for publication, and when the revised edition was announced in 2017, the Wollschläger Estate blocked its publication, arguing that the changes had "desecrated" Wollschläger's artistic work. The 2018 Suhrkamp edition exists only in a limited run of 200 copies for libraries and scholars.

=== French ===
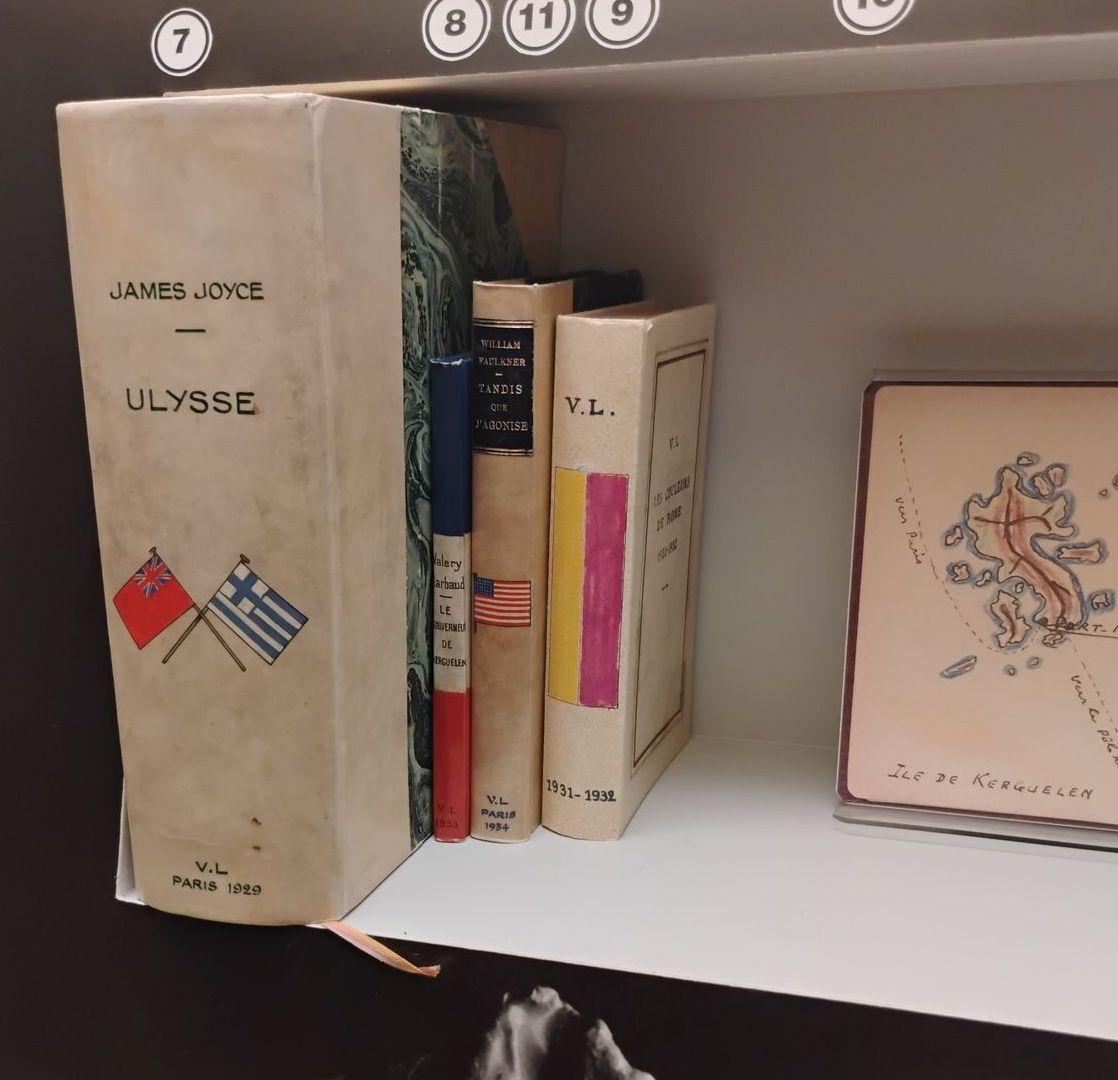
The 1929 French translation

The first French translation was published in 1929. It was made by August Morel, Stuart Gilbert, Valery Larbaud, and publisher Adrienne Monnier. Joyce himself assisted in translation; he was involved from the very start in 1922, and even "organized them [translators] into a team with a plan and a mission". Joyce chose Larbaud as the main reviser; he also "insisted on closeness to original denotation" and was anxious of possible mistranslations. It was the second published translation of Ulysses after the 1927 German one. It was noted for "its incredible rendering of French as it was spoken in the 1920s, to the point of being praised as an 'incredible anatomy of the French language' by André Topia". Because of that, the translation became "difficult to understand without a dictionary or without notes", as Morel used too many "contemporary idioms, idiosyncrasies and slang". The book was expensive and did not sell well.

The second French translation, done by a team led by Jacques Aubert, was published by Gallimard in 2004. Aubert's team had eight people: Jacques Aubert, Marie-Danièle Vors, Michel Cusin, Pascal Bataillard (academics); Tiphaine Samoyault, Patrick Drevet, Sylvie Doizelet (writers); and Bernard Hœpffner (translator). Their way of working on the book was different from Morel's:

The first team of translators had been organized along a hierarchical pattern: Auguste Morel had translated the whole book, then his work had been reviewed by Stuart Gilbert, and then by Valery Larbaud who had the final say. Joyce answered questions and solved conflicts between the translators. This hierarchical organization implied a horizontal approach to the translation of the novel, as the translators worked on the episodes in chronological order and those were then successively revised, by Morel and Gilbert, and then Larbaud. In 2004, Jacques Aubert insisted on a more democratic organization, which was also linked to a more vertical approach to the text: each translator was in charge of one episode or more.

One of the translators, Tiphaine Samoyault, noted that such organization "facilitated the process of renouncing all linguistic normativity", Bernard Hœpffner called it an "eight-person schizophrenia". The team translated all the book's chapters except "Oxen of the Sun", that was taken from 1929 Morel's edition; according to translators, "this inscribed the history of the French translation of Ulysses within the work, making for a parallel with the particular style of the fourteenth episode, as the history of translation mirrored the history of the English language".

April 8, 2003 – Which Bible should we use? "House of bondage" could be translated by "Maison de l'esclavage" (Sacy), "Maison de la servitude" (Segond), or "Maison d'asservis" (Bayard); "wilderness" by "solitude" (Sacy) or "désert" (Segond). No decision is made, but we have to respect the echoes.
—From Bernard Hœpffner's diary about many challenges in translation.

The second translation used the 1922 text as the source. In contrast with the Morel's translation, the new one did not "Gallicize" proper names. Each member of the team translated different episodes; this approach was criticized because it led to the loss of Joyce's leitmotifs.

=== Czech ===
The first Czech translation of Ulysses appeared in 1930, as a collaborative effort between Ladislav Vymětal and Jarmila Fastrová. Vymětal worked on the opening sections through "Sirens" and the final portion, starting from "Circe", while Fastrová translated the middle sections beginning with "Wandering Rocks."

The next translation came from Aloys Skoumal, published by Odeon in 1976 as Odysseus. Skoumal worked on the book for "five decades". Despite its substantial initial printing of 7,000 copies, the Communist regime censored it and restricted its circulation to Party members and psychiatrists. Skoumal had a personal connection to Joyce's Dublin, having visited the city in 1926. In a letter to writer Jaroslav Durych, he described Dublin as "a city of beggars, a city of poverty, dirt, dust, a city of ruined houses, a city of people who despite their humiliation have something noble (dare I say royal) about them". The initial price was 45 crowns, but at the blackmarket the book could cost 700.

Skoumal's translation is notable for its "artificial" language, though it differs from Joyce's original by employing more archaic vocabulary. This choice was partially driven by the challenges of representing regional diversity in Czech, a relatively uniform language. Instead of attempting to capture locality, Skoumal opted for temporal distance through archaic language to achieve poetic effects.

Skoumal's "highly criticised" translation was rereleased in 2012.

=== Japanese ===
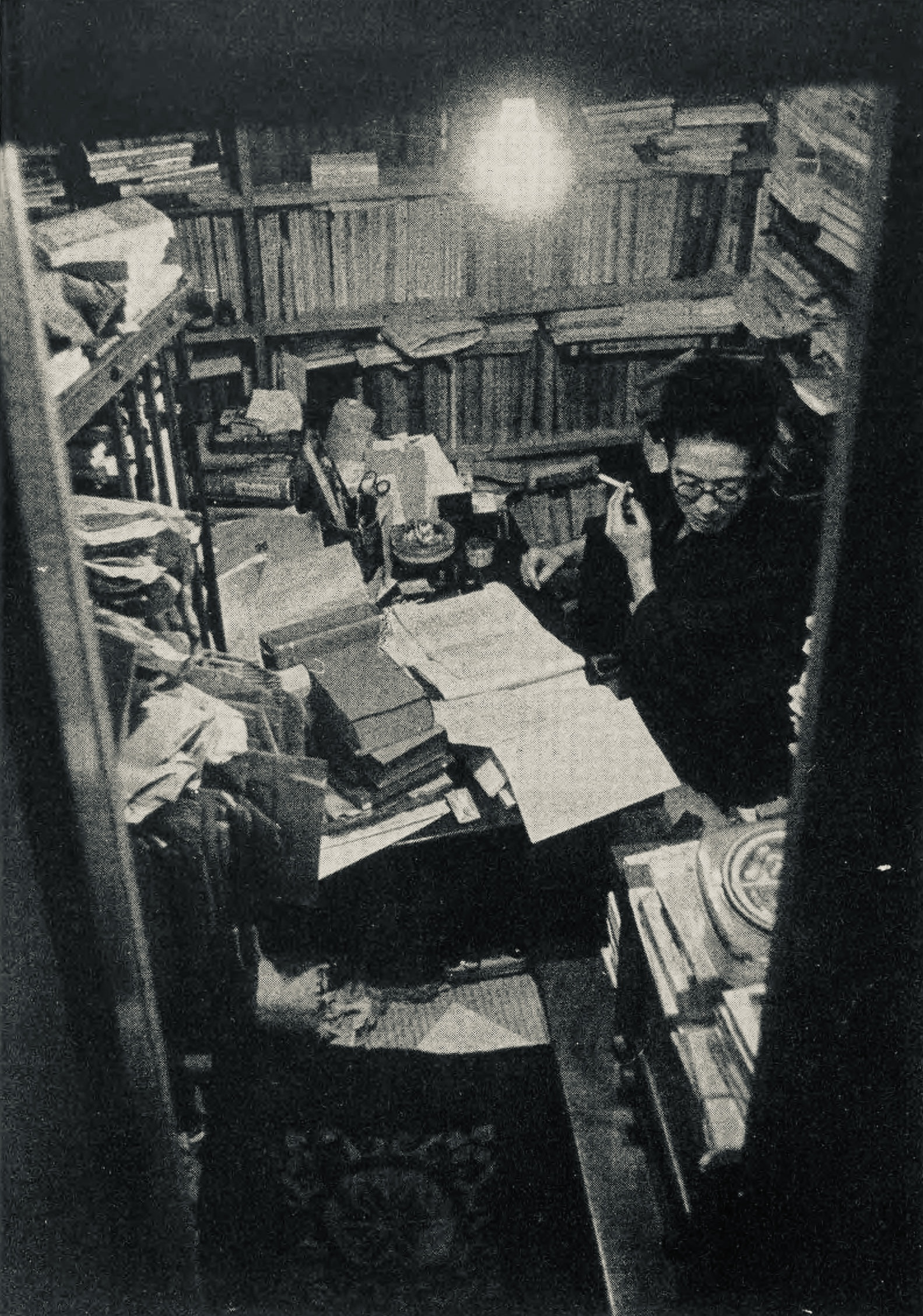
Sei Ito, the main author behind the first translation

The first Japanese translation was made by Sei Ito, Sadamu Nagamatsu and Hisanori Tsuji, and published in two parts by Daiichi-Shobo, Tokyo in 1931 and 1934. The translation was "pirated", as its authors did not have rights to publish the book. Some parts were omitted to bypass the state censorship, but the book was banned in 1934. Multiple versions of the first translation exist, with various omissions. Ito published another translation of the first volume in 1938. The full version of this translation was finally published in two volumes in 1955.

The second translation was made by Sohei Morita, Nahara Hirosaburo, Naotaro Tatsuguchi, Takehito Ono, Ichiro Ando and Eitaro Murayama and published "in five small paperbound volumes" from 1932 to 1935 in Tokyo. The last volume contained multiple omissions, it was done following the ban of the first translation. Full version of the second translation, without deletions, was published in 1952.

Both early translations were done without Joyce's authorization; nevertheless, Joyce was very interested in it and claimed that "20,000 copies of U in Japanese sold in Japan in 6 months" in 1933.

The third translation by Saiichi Maruya, Reiji Nagakawa and Yuichi Takamatsu was published in 1964; revised edition was published in 1996–1997.

Translator Naoki Yanase, who previously translated Finnegans Wake, translated the first 12 episodes of Ulysses. He died in 2016, before he finished the whole book; his translation was published posthumously.

== Iberian peninsula and Latin America ==
=== Spanish ===
The first Spanish translation was done by José Salas Subirat, and published in Buenos Aires in 1945; a revised version was published in 1952. Criticized at first, his translation garnered more attention later:

Juan José Saer used to tell a funny story about this: when he was young, Saer and some friends met Borges, who was very dissatisfied with that translation: "It is really bad," Borges said, but someone – probably Saer himself – disagreed: "It might be, but if it is, Mr Salas Subirat is the greatest writer in the Spanish language."

Subirat translated the book from 1940 to 1945; he had little experience in translation and was an employee of an insurance company. He did not speak English. Besides that, he wrote several self-help books and owned a toy factory. He became mostly forgotten after his death in 1975; his biography was published in 2016.

According to María Luisa Venegas Lagüéns, Subirat's translation "domesticates the source text and tends to insert too many explanations". He wrote it in an Argentinian Spanish with many regionalisms, that made it less accessible to readers from other Spanish-speaking countries, especially from Spain. It is especially evident in translation of jargon and taboo language: e.g. Subirat translated "cunt" as "concha", that means the same thing in Argentina but in Spain only means a "shell", and was a popular women's name.

The second translation, made by philosophy professor José María Valverde, was published in Barcelona in 1976.

The third Spanish translation was made by Francisco García Tortosa and María Luisa Venegas Lagüéns, both literature scholars, and published in 1999. Translators said in a later interview that they "don't want a translation of Ulysses in colloquial Spanish, we want it like Joyce wrote it".

Argentian Marcelo Zabaloy, who calls himself an "amateur translator", published a lipogramatic translation in 2015. Inspired by Georges Perec's experimental novel that did not contain the letter "e" in French, his translation lacks the letter "a" in Spanish.

Another translation was done by Rolando Costa Picazo and published in 2018.

=== Portuguese ===
Portuguese has six translations of Ulysses – four Brazilian and two European Portuguese versions, though the linguistic differences between Brazilian and European Portuguese make it difficult for Brazilians to fully evaluate the European translations.

==== Brazil ====
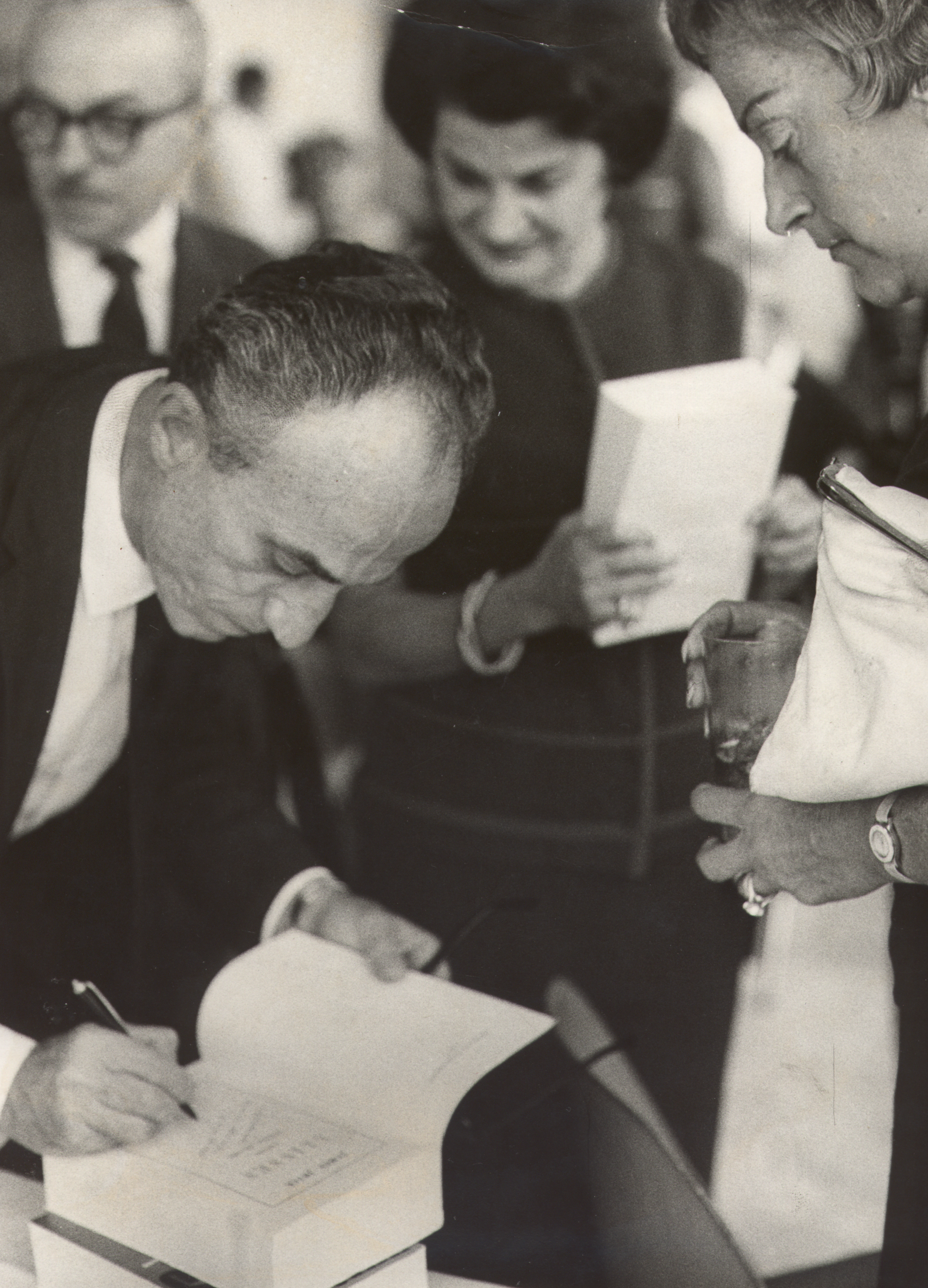
Antônio Houaiss signing a copy of his translation

The first Brazilian-Portuguese translation was completed by Antônio Houaiss in 1966. Houaiss, a diplomat who later created a major Portuguese dictionary, was "forced into early retirement" by Brazil's military dictatorship before undertaking the translation. Houaiss spent less than a year translating the book.

The second Brazilian translation came from Bernardina da Silveira Pinheiro in 2005. Pinheiro, who had studied with Joyce scholar Richard Ellmann, had previously translated Joyce's A Portrait of the Artist as a Young Man (1992). The book was published in two volumes, with the translator's notes at the end of each volume. The translation was based on Gabler's edition. The revised translation was published in 2007.

The third Brazilian translation was published in 2012 by Caetano Galindo, who started it in 2002 as part of a doctoral thesis. He also translated other Joyce's works, such as A Portrait of the Artist as a Young Man, Dubliners, Giacomo Joyce and Finn's Hotel; he also published "the first companion to Ulysses in Portuguese". He took a notably different approach to the "Oxen of the Sun" episode, creating Portuguese-Brazilian equivalents for Joyce's "literary pastiches":

I thought I had to create a full-blown list of Portuguese-Brazilian equivalents to the authors, styles, genres and periods that Joyce had emulated, with all the limitations that come from a much shorter literary history. Then I had to translate the original trying to create pastiches of true historical Portuguese texts, from the trovadores of the 13th century, through Camões and Brazilian Romanticism, to end with a collage of all types of jargons.

Galindo won the Prêmio Jabuti for the best translation in 2013. It was republished in 2022, with illustrations by Robert Motherwell, without the introduction from the first edition, and with six critical essays added. Galindo's translation was titled Ulysses, while two previous translation were both Ulisses.

The most recent, fourth, Brazilian Portuguese translation, Ulisses – A dezoito vozes (Ulysses in eighteen voices), edited by Henrique Piccinato Xavier, was published in 2022 by the Ateliê Editorial.

It was to explore the multiple nature of Ulysses that philosopher Henrique Piccinato Xavier conceived a unique translation project, in celebration of the work's centennial: if each chapter has such a radically different style, mobilizing issues of language, literary repertoire and vocabulary, among others, so distinct, as if they were written by 18 different authors, why not do a translation project that brings together a different translator for each of these chapters? For the chapter that has music as its theme, why not call on a composer to recreate it in Portuguese? For the chapter that narrates the funeral of a friend of Bloom's, why not entrust it to be translated by a writer whose theme is precisely death? Thus was born the project Ulysses a 18 vozes...

The translators are Aurora Fornoni Bernardini (Telêmaco); Dirce Waltrick do Amarante (Nestor); Julián Fuks (Proteu); Luisa Geisler (Calipso); Guilherme Gontijo Flores (Os Lotófagos); Carlos de Brito e Mello (Hades); João Adolfo Hansen (Éolo); Alípio Correia de Franca Neto (Os Lestrigões); José Roberto O'Shea (Cila e Caribde); Eclair Antônio Almeida Filho (As Rochas Ondulantes); Willy Corrêa de Oliveira (As Sereias); Henrique Piccinato Xavier (O Ciclope); Antonio Quinet (Nausícaa); Élide Valarini Oliver (Gado do Sol); Donaldo Schüler (Circe); Piero Eyben (Eumeu); Denise Bottmann (Ítaca) and Luci Collin (Penélope).

==== Portugal ====
The first translation of Ulysses into European Portuguese was made by João Palma-Ferreira and published in 1989, and republished in 2022. An earlier Portuguese edition, published in 1983, had used Antônio Houaiss's 1966 Brazilian translation, with its orthography adapted for Portugal. Palma-Ferreira wrote a introduction "Nota do Tradutor", where he discussed the composition and reception of the novel, Joyce's other works and the narrative techniques employed in Ulysses, and wrote notes preceding the episodes explained their parallels with the Odyssey.

A second European Portuguese translation, by Jorge Vaz de Carvalho, was published in 2013. de Carvalho's edition has almost no notes; the edition contains Richard Ellmann's essay "Ulisses: Uma Breve História". Teresa Casal praised de Carvalho for recreating Joyce's stylistic effects in Portuguese through a combination of intelligibility, sensuality and verbal suggestiveness. Hugo Pinto Santos highlighted de Carvalho's use of alliteration and his willingness to privilege Joyce's musical effects over strict lexical equivalence. The translation received the Associação Portuguesa de Tradutores' literary translation prize in 2015.

=== Catalan ===
The first Catalan translation was done by writer and translator Joan Francesc Vidal Jové, in 1966, but was not published. The translation is kept in the General Spanish Archive (Archivo General de la Administración) in Alcalá de Henares, Madrid. It was commissioned by the Editorial AHR; the translation was done in seven months from the Morel's French translation. The censorship office allowed the book to be published; the reason it was not published is unknown.

The Catalan translation by Joaquim Mallafre was published in 1981. It was described as the "most significant event in Catalan intellectual circles" and received the Prize of the Generalitat and the Serra d'Or Prize. It was thought to be the first Catalan translation of Ulysses, because the Vidal Jove's version was unpublished. Mallafre's translation was considered "excellent", and was celebrated as a huge achievement for the Catalan language. In 1991, Mallafre defended his PhD thesis on literary translation, based on his translation of Ulysses.

The third translation by Carles Llorach-Freixes was published in 2018. Llorach wanted to make the book more accessible to the readers; his translation has footnotes and the translator's introductions for each chapter. He used Mallafre's version as an "intermediate translation". For "Oxen of the Sun" Llorach imitated various styles to show the evolution of the language, "from the troubadours to the Renaixença and Noucentisme".

=== Galician ===
Ramón Otero Pedrayo translated several excerpts in 1926. Often referred to simply as "anacos" or "fragments", these excerpts were published in the Galician journal Nós.

The first complete Galician translation of Ulysses was published in 2013. Four translators – Xavier Queipo, María Alonso Seisdedos, Eva Almazán and Antón Vialle – spent ten years on the project, working together on the entire text rather than dividing it. The team worked twelve hours daily, seven days a week. Their work was delayed by Joyce estate restrictions, and was published in 2013 when the book entered the public domain.

Scholar M. Teresa Caneda Cabrera noted the long gap between translations reflected Galician language standardization problems. The translation was called "a turning point in the history of translation in Galicia".

=== Basque ===
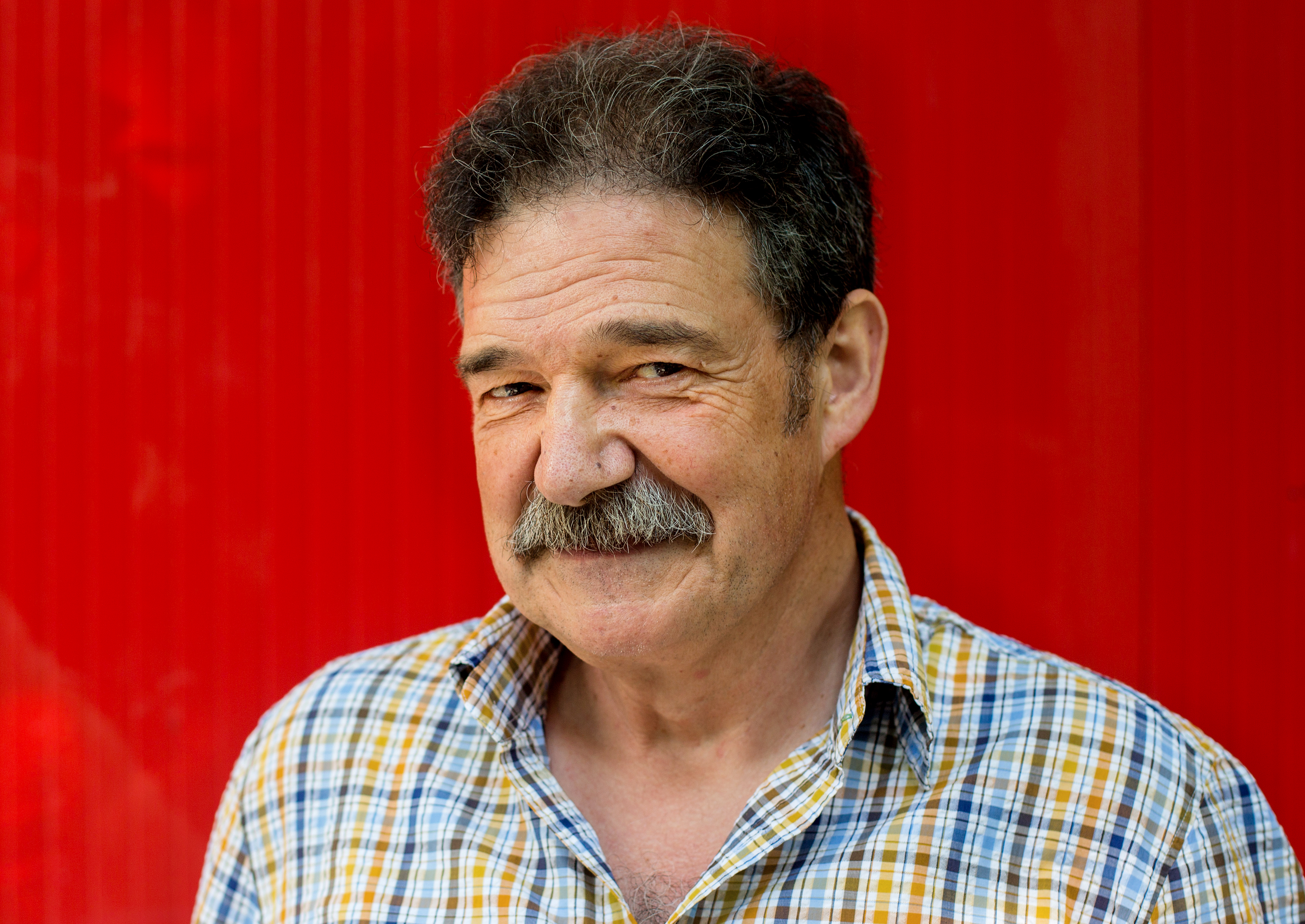
Xabier Olarra

The first complete Basque translation of Ulysses was undertaken by Xabier Olarra and published by Igela publishing house in 2015, with a revised centenary edition released in 2022. The translation, supported by a European Union grant, took approximately three years to complete (2012–2015). The 2022 centenary edition included various refinements, including revisions to certain repeated phrases and historical terminology. Olarra himself described the ongoing process of improving the translation as "Sisyphean work". The book was called "a milestone in the literary translation to the Basque country".

Olarra approached the translation systematically, consulting critical works including Ulysses Annotated, Hans Walter Gabler's corrected text, and notes by Don Gifford and Sam Slote. His translation includes over 2,000 endnotes explaining cultural references, wordplay, and ambiguities. A distinctive feature of the translation is its use of Basque familiar forms (hika) for interior monologues, notably employing noka (feminine familiar) for Molly Bloom's soliloquy.

For the stylistically complex "Oxen of the Sun", Olarra imitated the evolution of Basque prose styles, drawing from archaic writers like Bernard Etxepare and Leizarraga to modern Basque. The translation maintains Joyce's intentional repetitions rather than using synonyms, and develops creative solutions for English and Irish wordplay without direct Basque equivalents.

== Mediterranean Europe ==
=== Italian ===
As of 2025, there are nine Italian translations of the book.

1. Giulio De Angelis (1960): The first complete Italian translation published by Mondadori. De Angelis worked independently, completing the translation without prior commissioning, and only later submitted it to Mondadori. Little is known about the translator; he was not an academic (he got a PhD in English in 1947, and then became a school teacher) and this is likely a reason of "standoffish treatment" from critics. A companion volume, Guida alla lettura, was published with the translation, with an introduction by Giorgio Melchiori and notes on each episode by the translator. The revised edition was done using Hans Walter Gabler's critical edition to address textual inconsistencies. Published in 1988, the second edition was criticized for its "sloppy editorial practice".
2. Bona Flecchia (1995): Published by Shakespeare & Company, this translation was withdrawn due to copyright issues, leaving it largely unavailable for readers. The edition included nine maps of Dublin, bibliography, the Linati scema and Gilbert table. Bona Flecchia was called a "theater interpreter of Shakespearean texts, who in addition uses 'pirate words'". The translation was done from the Gabler edition, with De Angelis translation as a reference. Flecchia's translation was described as "less accurate, though often quite effective and original".
3. Enrico Terrinoni and Carlo Bigazzi (2012): Published by Newton Compton Editori after copyright protection expired, this translation includes a detailed introduction, biographical note, bibliography, and critical annotations. It was awarded the Premio Napoli in 2012. Terrinoni, a Joyce scholar and noted expert in Irish literature, described his translation as "my translation is more popular/demotic, it has a language closer to how it's talked, De Angelis one was more noble and dignified". For the "Oxen of the Sun", he started with an "ancient Italian style and we show its progression".
4. Gianni Celati (2013): This Einaudi edition with no annotations. Celati worked for seven years on his translation.
5. Mario Biondi (2020): Biondi tried to translate Ulysses in 1970s, but found it too difficult. After he became an experienced translator, he returned to the book. Published by La nave di Teseo, this annotated edition includes a map of 1904 Dublin and a detailed introduction by the translator, along with ~2,000 notes to guide the reader. It is based on corrected 1922 edition, and on the text prepared by Project Gutenberg (also based on 1922–1923 edition).
6. Alessandro Ceni (2021): Translated by a famous poet, and published by Feltrinelli with an introductory note.
7. Enrico Terrinoni (2021): Published by Giunti Editore; a bilingual parallel text. It features essays, notes, Homeric correspondences, maps, and additional materials. It is an entirely new translation, distinct from 2012 translation co-authored by Terrinoni.
8. Marco Marzagalli (2021): An independent publication by a retired computer scientist; an "entirely annotated translation" available on Amazon.
9. Livio Crescenzi, Tonina Giuliani, Marta Viazzoli (2021): Published by Mattioli. According to Crescenzi, their approach to Ulysses "was a more 'formal' approach than content-based, more attentive to the technique of language and narration than to a symbolic or philosophical discourse".

=== Greek ===
The first translated excerpts of Ulysses appeared in Greek in 1936. The first translation of Ulysses was done by Leonidas Nikolouzos and Giannis Thomopoulos, and published in nine installments by Ekdoseis Pairidi in 1969–1976.

The second translation was published in 1991, done by the film director and poet Socrates Kapsaskis. It received mixed reviews: one noted "philological inadequacy" of the translation, while others, like Peter Constantine, praised it, writing that Kapsaskis

had recreated a work of Homeric proportions, with lexical combinations ranging from the very modern colloquial language to Byzantine, New Testament, and Ancient Greek. As the Greek press pointed out when it appeared, there was nothing in the translation to indicate that the original Irish author, Τζαίημς Τζόυς, had not written the greatest book of the twentieth century originally in Greek, "a language with more depth and range than any other tongue with such an illustrious ancient heritage."

Kapsaskis was awarded the European Union Translation Prize for it in 1992.

== Scandinavia ==
=== Swedish ===
The poet and translator Thomas Warburton, "a Swedish-speaking British citizen who was born in Finland", started to translate Ulysses in Helsinki in 1943, during the World War II, being an enemy alien in Finland. In 1944, all British citizens were evacuated to Sweden, where he continued to work on the book. Later, Warburton recalled that the translation was done in "one year of full-time work", and it was published in 1946 under the title Odysseus. Warburton was just 25 when he started to translate it. The 1946 edition had no footnotes and no foreword. He revised his translation in 1993. In the revision, Warburton introduced over four thousand changes, guided by Hans Walter Gabler's annotated edition and newer Joyce scholarship.

Warburton used "Stockholm's criminal dialect and lower slang from 1910–1920" in his translation.

Critics generally admired both the 1946 and the 1993 Warburton versions, but the publisher believed a retranslation was warranted and commissioned Erik Andersson in 2007 to take on this task.

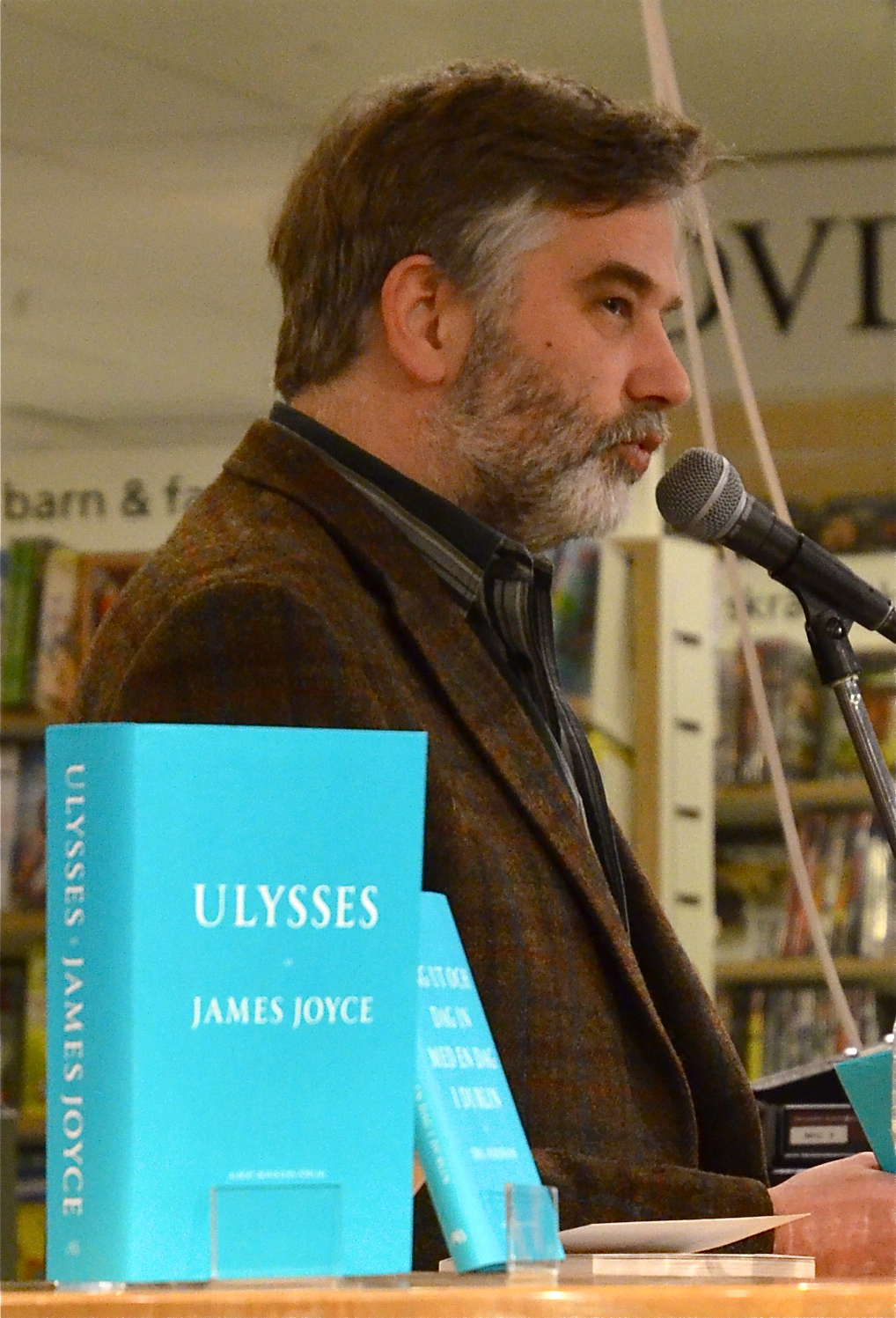
Andersson during an interview

Andersson, a Swedish author and "celebrity translator" who gained attention through his retranslation of J. R. R. Tolkien's Hobbit and The Lord of the Rings, worked on Ulysses while simultaneously writing a "translation diary". In 2012, his new Swedish edition was released in a volume that deliberately echoed the 1922 Shakespeare and Company cover design, though the publisher clarifies that it was based on the first British edition. Andersson's title returned to Ulysses. This choice signaled the text's alignment with Joyce's original naming and brought the Swedish version in line with other European retranslations that had shifted to Ulysses (i.e. Dutch and Finnish). A short postscript by Stephen Farran-Lee replaced the longer afterword found in Warburton's 1993 edition. Farran-Lee acknowledges that he is writing for readers who may have abandoned the novel partway and hopes to entice them back. Together with the novel itself, Andersson's translation diary, Dag in och dag ut med en dag i Dublin (Day In and Day Out with One Day in Dublin), was published. In 2013, an audiobook narrated by famous actor, Reine Brynolfsson, was released. Andersson consulted earlier Warburton's translation as a "safety net".

Major Swedish newspapers gave the new translation extensive coverage. Andersson discussed Ulysses in interviews, referring to his efforts as "an intellectual capability test". The marketing of the book began well before its publication, with short excerpts – labeled "Joyceries" – published in Dagens Nyheter, a prominent Swedish paper. Criticism appeared in about fifty newspapers, many publishing the same reviews. The overall response was enthusiastic. Some critics felt Warburton's text had become dated, while others defended its continued readability. Many noted that Andersson's version is "rawer, filthier, and more physical", bringing the text closer to Joyce's unvarnished depiction of everyday life. Specific examples include Andersson's avoidance of euphemisms for body parts, a contrast with Warburton's earlier work. Other reviewers highlighted Andersson's different dialect choices (he used the West Swedish västgötska dialect, though one critic complained about "a stereotypical accent of Southern Stockholm ('Söderslang')", which provoked disagreement as to whether he successfully matched Joyce's varied registers. The retranslation's publication was a carefully staged literary event: Andersson appeared on Sweden's major TV literature program, took part in readings and discussions, and gave numerous interviews.

=== Danish ===
'I am James Joyce. I understand that you are to translate Ulysses, and I have come from Paris to tell you not to alter a single word.'
—Joyce reportedly said this to Kastor Hansen "during a surprise visit to her home" in 1936.

The history of Danish translation of Ulysses is centered around Mogens Boisen, a lieutenant-colonel of the Danish army and one of Denmark's most prolific translators, credited with translating approximately 800 books from various languages; he is called the "most remarkable translator of all time".

Boisen's first translation of Ulysses was published in 1949, after 18 years of work, followed by a significantly revised edition in 1970 (with episodes 1–5 and 9 completely retranslated), and further revised editions in 1980 and 1986. This level of dedication to self-retranslation is exceptional both in translation history generally and among Ulysses translations specifically.

His most significant challenge (called to be Boisen's "obsession") was tracking Joyce's "leitmotifs", which he described as "thousands of them, often only a word, but it must be repeated maybe 700 pages later, and repeated either in the identical form or in some significant variation". Boisen developed an "elaborate filing system" to track these motifs, and this obsession extended beyond the Danish translation – he later assisted with correcting leitmotifs in the German translation by Goyert, and offered similar help for the French and Swedish versions.

The impact of the translation work was profound; Boisen described it as the "decisive event" of his life, stating "One is not the same. One has been Ulyssified." This followed an earlier attempt at translating the work – in 1936, Joyce himself had met with potential translator, Johanne Kastor Hansen, in Copenhagen; according to Boisen she declined, finding some parts "too markedly masculine and advanced for her talents".

In 2014, the book was newly translated by Karsten Sand Iversen for Forlaget Rosinante. It was described as "self-aware and phenomenal re-poetry".

In 2019, the third translation was made by Bent Wiberg (chapters 1–15) and Jens Feilberg (chapters 16–18) and published by Forlaget Vandkunsten. This edition had around 3000 explanatory notes.

=== Finnish ===
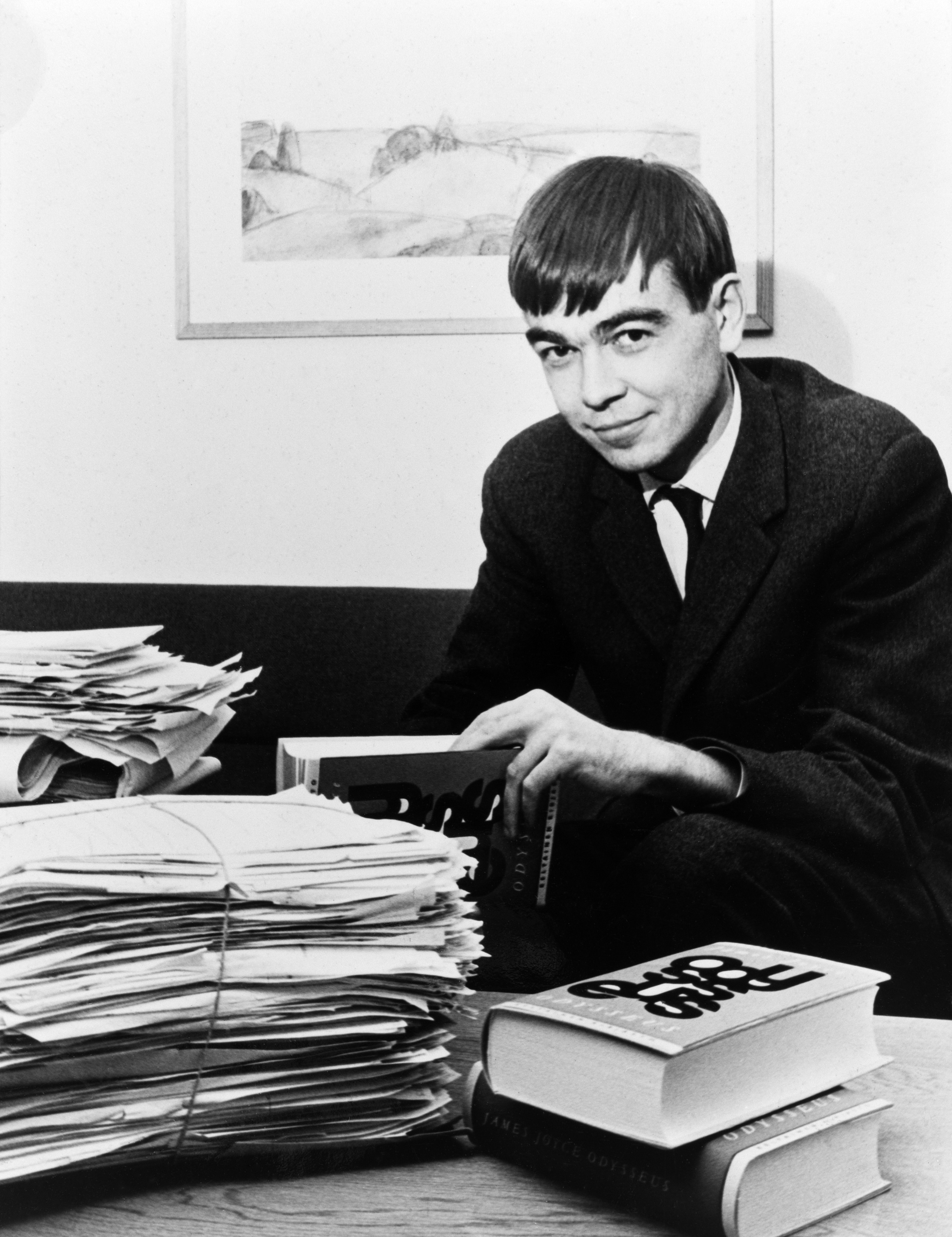
Saarikoski with Odysseus

The first Finnish translation by celebrity poet Pentti Saarikoski was published in 1964, "hurriedly done" in six months and titled Odysseus. Saarikoski was 25 when he published his translation. He later wrote that he "knew English quite poorly"; he consulted with five different translations. Many enthusiasts felt that Saarikoski's effort did not fully capture Joyce's original, though it was "hailed as one of the most memorable events in Finnish translated literature", yet also that the text became "stranger" than Joyce likely intended.

In 2012, Leevi Lehto published his Finnish translation of Ulysses, which he began in 2001. He titled his new translation Ulysses rather than Odysseus. He commented on the previous translation that it "is what Joyce's Ulysses might have become if Joyce had let Ezra Pound have his way with it", mainly because of the Finnish modernist Tuomas Anhava's influence on Saarikoski.

Lehto scanned each episode of the original and placed it in the left column of a two-column file, with Saarikoski's text on the right. He then started "systematic 'destruction'" of Saarikoski's text using the original text, sometimes describing this as translating "Ulysses from Saarikoski to Joyce." Lehto used Hans Walter Gabler's 1985 edition as his source text and consulted Gifford & Seidman's Ulysses Annotated, as well as the second edition of the Swedish translation by Thomas Warburton (which he called "a solid and fairly flawless text") for comparison.

Lehto found Ulysses to be "the most demanding and yet the easiest" work he had undertaken. He explains that "every sentence of Ulysses has 'something to translate'" beyond mere meaning, which creates more freedom for the translator. By focusing on conveying the how rather than strictly trying to convey the what, he saw the boundary between writing and translating disappear: "I would no longer consider this work secondary to my 'own original' writing."

In the "Oxen of the Sun" episode, Joyce parodies the evolution of English prose. Lehto replaces these stylistic stages with phases of Finnish prose. He studied Paavo Pulkkinen's work on modern Finnish language (Suomalaisen Kirjallisuuden Seura, 1972) to replicate Joyce's method of citing historical manuals, though he admits the histories of English and Finnish do not run parallel. For example, he associates John Bunyan with the Finnish vicar Henrik Renqvist, while Oliver Goldsmith is paired with August Ahlqvist, and Laurence Sterne with Aleksis Kivi. He calls these links "arbitrary", since Joyce himself "fully knew the illegitimacy of his purpose".

Because Finnish lacks gendered third-person pronouns, Lehto introduced hen to clarify passages where characters change gender – such as Bloom's transformations in "Circe." He previously used "hen" in a John Ashbery translation, provoking criticism for its "violence against the Finnish language". For its usage in Ulysses, reaction was less severe, although some readers were "taken aback by it". Lehto posits that Joyce would not have found hen shocking.

Lehto completed his manuscript with 2,500 notes, and final edits were done referencing the Gabler synoptic edition.

=== Icelandic ===
Sigurður A. Magnússon's translation was published in 1992–93 in two volumes. It was titled Ódysseifur to connect it with famous Icelandic translation of the Odyssey, Odysseusðan by Sveinbjörn Egilsson, "whose renderings of the Homeric epics are among the most important translations in the Icelandic language". The translation of Ulysses was called to be "late", and thus done from the revised edition of the original, where multiple errors and typos were corrected.

=== Norwegian ===
In 1973, Boisen's Danish translation was published in Norway and received wide press coverage and positive reviews.

Olav Angell translated the book into Norwegian in 1993, after three years of work. Around 8,000 copies were sold. He was awarded with the Norwegian Cultural Council's Translator's Prize. The translation got mixed reviews from critics, from positive to "downright brutal".

== Western Europe ==
=== Dutch ===
Ulysses has three Dutch translations. The first one, done by John Vandenbergh, was published in 1969; Vandenbergh called the translation "a daring act".

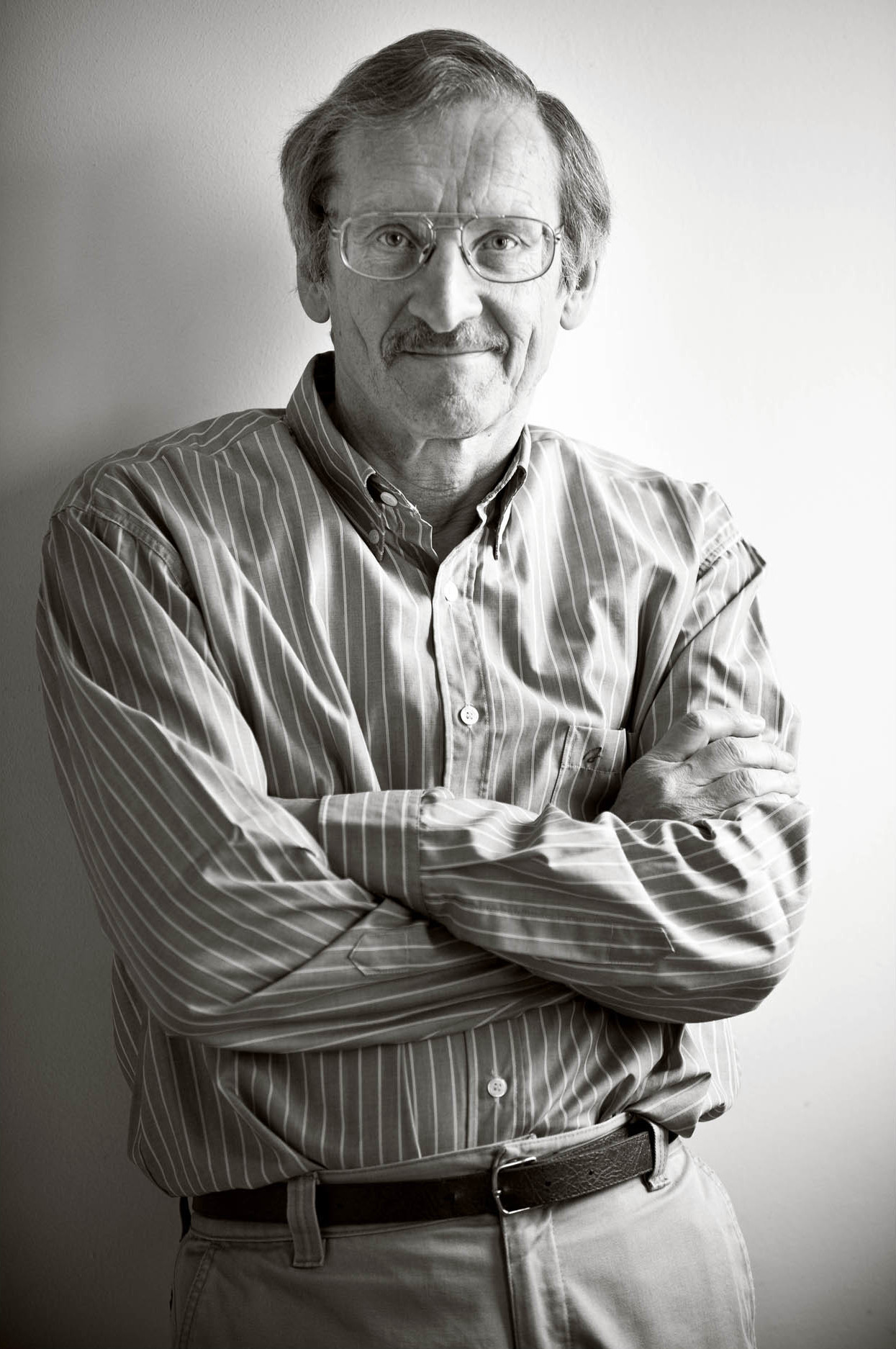
Paul Claes

Belgian Flemish writers and translators Paul Claes and Mon Nys translated the book into Flemish Dutch, that was published in 1994, and, according to the James Geary's 1996 review, "ignited a linguistic civil war between the northern Dutch and the southern Belgian speakers of Dutch". According to the translators, they used "standard Dutch", but it contained unfamiliar words for Dutch speakers from Holland and was criticized for that. On the other hand, Belgian reviewer criticised it for being not Flemish enough. Geary noted that "the translation's greatest achievement is that it has sparked a lively debate between the Dutch and the Flemish about the common language that separates them."

In 2012, Robbert Jan Henkes and Erik Bindervoet published their translation, which they call "badly needed". They summarized their criticism of the previous translations in a subsequent article:

The main objection is one of tone and music. Ulysses, "a gobelin depicting the world in a day" was, in their words, "made into a doormat with the message "welcome"" in the previous Dutch translations. Lacking is the richness, the uncompromising unicity of the Joycean style. Both translations flatten and dumb and dim down to a large extent. They may be Dutch, but they are not Joycean.

=== Irish ===
Ulysses was published in Irish translation in 1991–1992, seventy years after its original publication. The translation, titled Uiliséas, was primarily done by James Henry (Séamas Ó hInnéirghe), a retired medical doctor and former Royal Air Force officer. Henry used Irish at home and in school in his childhood, though rarely used it in his later life.

The translation took eight years (1984–1991); Henry worked on it from his Belfast home, assisted by his brother-in-law Basil Wilson (Breasail Uilsean) and childhood friend James Mangan (Séamus Ó Mongáin), both of whom had expertise in old and middle Irish. Henry's son Basil (Breasail Ó hInnéirghe) also contributed to one booklet, and Mangan completed another booklet independently.

== Central Europe ==
=== Hungarian ===
Ulysses was first translated into Hungarian by Endre Gáspár. The book was published in 1,000 copies in 1947. This translation was both praised and heavily criticised: writer Miklós Szentkuthy, who translated the book in 1974, wrote of Gáspár's translation that it "'normalises', 'consolidates', 'flattens', 'dilutes', 'irons out', 'sobers up', 'tames', 'greys', 'kills' Joyce's sentences, depriving them of their poetry, playfulness, word-music and rhythm".

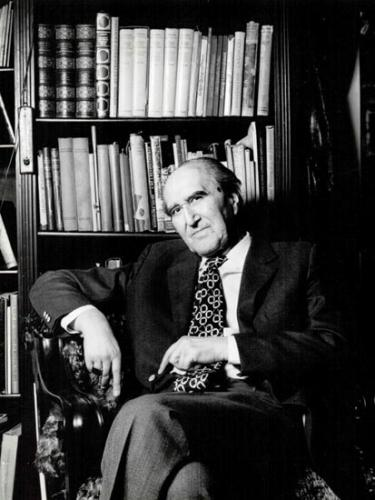
Miklós Szentkuthy

Szentkuthy's translation of 1974 became canonical in Hungary, and was described as "the crowning achievement of Hungarian translation culture", having a "cultic status", and being an "integral part of Hungarian culture". It was republished in 1986, under editorial corrections by Tibor Bartos. In 2012, it was revised by a team of scholars, András Kappanyos, Marianna Gula, Dávid Szolláth and Gábor Zoltán Kiss. It is said to be "re-editing and partial retranslation based on Szentkuthy's work which occasionally refers to Gáspár's text ... the Revised text is a scholarly palimpsest written across the two previous texts".

Szentkuthy, a noted author and translator, is sometimes called "the Hungarian Joyce"; his first novel was compared with Joyce's works for its apparent lack of structure. His translation of Ulyssess is criticized because he "seems to have wanted to appropriate Ulysses as his own work and to become Joyce's co-author rather than a "mere" translator". His translation was said to "out-Joycing Joyce himself".

Kappanyos described previous translations and the group's motivation for a revised edition:

Gáspár, the first translator, was an erudite man of letters with a huge corpus of translations behind him, and in his preface he calls Ulysses the greatest effort of his career. His text is scholarly: its aim is to retain as much information as possible, while trying not to trick readers into believing that they are reading a product of their own familiar culture. Szentkuthy, the second translator, was a first-rate writer and a virtuoso of style, as well as an early follower of Joyce. His text is artistic. He wanted to recreate in Hungarian Joyce's creative effort and the deep cultural effect of his work, including its scandalous nature. He wished to draw the whole composition culturally closer, so he basically gave up on the idea of "Irishness" and did not bother to understand every motivation sentence-to-sentence, word-by-word. When he failed to understand an utterance, he usually substituted something obscenely funny, in accord with his general idea of the book. When he failed to find the proper solution, he fabricated some colorful nonsense, based on his own ideas of linguistic creativity. He often could not resist his own virtuoso ideas, and so he "improved" on Joyce. His jokes are sometimes really funny, but they have nothing to do with Joyce.

Erika Mihálycsa noted that Hungarian "is particularly ill-suited" to show the "diversity of idiolects", because, as an isolated, landlocked language, it lacks major dialects, and has only regional accents.

=== Polish ===
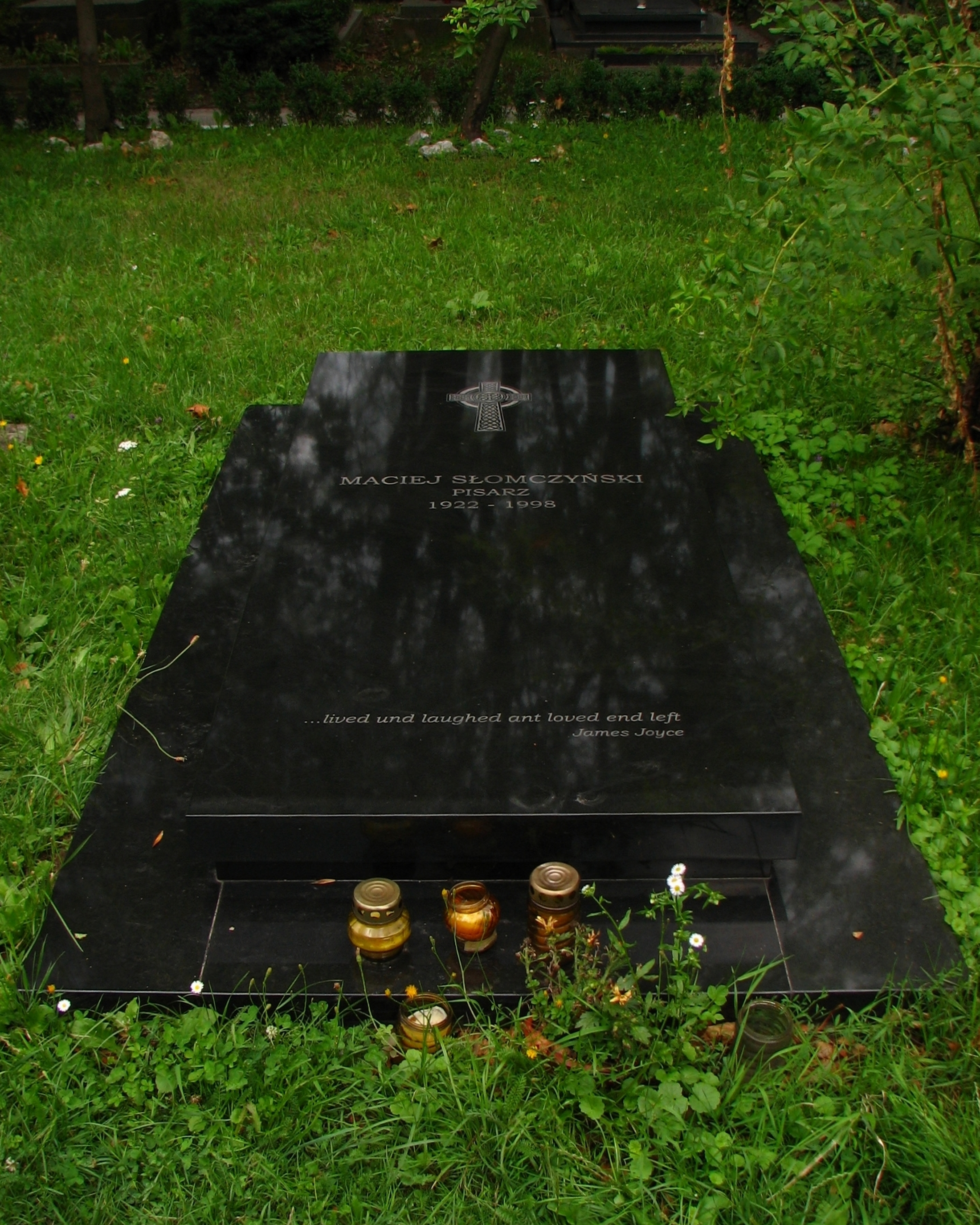
Słomczyński's grave with a quote by Joyce

The first full Polish translation was published in 1969 by Maciej Słomczyński, and was called "a literary sensation" that "became a bestseller with 40,000 copies disappearing from bookshops immediately". On the black market, the book sold for up to 15 times its original price. Six episodes were previously published in magazines in 1958–1968. Słomczyński, who was also a detective fiction writer published under pen name Joe Alex, spent 13 years translating Ulysses. More than 200 reviews and articles appeared after the publication of the translation. In 1970, Słomczyński and Zygmunt Hubner premiered a theatrical version of Ulysses, centered on Molly's monologue.

Jolanta Wawrzycka calls Słomczyński a "genius-translator"; according to her, Joyce is known in Poland as "Joyce of/by Maciej Słomczyński". Słomczyński wrote that for him Ulysses was not a difficult book, and noted that he translated it in "150 days spread over 9 years".

The second translation was done by the University of Lodz lecturer Maciej Świerkocki in seven years, and published in 2021. He also published a companion volume about the translation, titled Łódź Ulyssesa ('The Boat of Ulysses'). Świerkocki won several awards for his translation. Świerkocki's version was noted for his innovative translation of puns; at the same time, he tends to simplify and over-explain some wordplay to make it more understandable to the readers.

=== Romanian ===
The Romanian translation of Ulysses was carried out by the poet and translator Mircea Ivănescu. Translated episodes appeared in the literary journal Secolul XX, the "Oxen of the Sun" episode in 1971, "Hades" in 1973, "Aeolus" in 1977, and "Cyclops" in 1982, before the full two-volume set was published in 1984. Ivănescu reportedly worked on Ulysses for around two decades while working on other translations. A post-1989 reprint added a few corrections, and in 1996 a single-volume edition introduced clearer divisions among the novel's eighteen chapters.

Romanian critics wrote positively about the translation; Adrian Oțoiu called it intellectually rigorous and noted an "unprecedented awareness of the intricacies of the Joycean text". Ivănescu gave a controversial interview in 2010 claiming he never read Ulysses in its entirety, describing how the scholar Andrei Brezianu simply assigned him each chapter to translate. He also remarked that he had read only about twenty books in his life.

Romanian itself posed difficulties: the language's distinctive verb endings prevent the pronominal indeterminacy that Joyce's text relies upon. Ivănescu found "Penelope" especially challenging, not only because the communist censors might object to blunt expressions but also because Romanian grammar forced him to break Joyce's fluid interior monologue and impose more structure into it.

The translation was self-censored and "un-sexed" to bypass state censorship; it is, nevertheless, called "doubtless the greatest translation achievement of one of Romania's most prominent, if discreet, contemporary poets".

The second translation, by Rares Moldovan, edited by Erika Mihálycsa, was published in 2023. According to the translator, "don't clarify!", "don't explain", and "don't correct" became "a kind of mantra" for them.

=== Slovak ===
Jozef Kot's Slovak translation was published in 1993. Kot was a university professor and noted translator, known for his translations of Shakespeare; he worked on Ulysses for ten years. His version was called "a not entirely accurate translation but by no means a dull" as he streamlined some Joycean linguistic features.

== Baltic states ==
=== Latvian ===
Dzintars Sodums spent around ten years on the Latvian translation and roughly 2000 Swedish kronor, and saw its publication in Sweden in 1960. Emigrant authors "reminisced nostalgically" about their earlier engagement with Joyce in prewar Latvia. Zenta Mauriņa commented in 1950 that "we in Riga were done with him [Joyce] already in 1930". This attitude, combined with exile circumstances, meant that Sodums's Ulysses never gained much readership and influence in Latvia. He was disappointed that his attempt to "shake the post-capitulation shambles of the Latvian spirit into a new shape" did not catch on. Following its release, there was little sustained conversation between Sodums and the broader Latvian literary world, and the translation's promise went largely unrealized despite the cultural significance of publishing Joyce in Latvian.

=== Lithuanian ===
Tomas Venclova translated three episods (1, 3, and 4) of the book in 1968; he said that it was "very difficult". According to him, Lithuanian language is well-suited for the translation, with slang being the most challenging part:

The Lithuanian language is very rich, sonorous, and archaic. It is one of the "classical" Indo-European languages and in some ways is close to the Celtic languages, including Gaelic, which of course is very pleasant for a translator of Joyce. ... But this language also has its shortcomings. It has an ancient folkloric tradition, but its literary tradition is not as extensive. Slang and the "urban" lexicon in general are relatively undeveloped; many stylistic registers which Joyce uses are almost completely lacking and have to be created.

For the "Oxen of the Sun", Venclova planned to use an extinct Old Prussian language.

The first full Lithuanian translation was published in 2003–2005 by Jeronimas Brazaitis as the primary translator, with Saulius Repečka as an editor. Brazaitis started to translate it in 1986, and published one chapter in 1989. He published all chapters in literary magazines by 2003; some readers thought that the magazines' versions are better than edited for the book. Brazaitis said that "the possession or absence of Ulysses determines the level of culture of a nation."

=== Estonian ===
Märt Väljataga published translations of three episodes in the 1990s. The first full translation was done by Paul-Eerik Rummo, edited by Väljataga, and published in 2024. The translation was named the 2024 Language Deed of the Year.

The translation has minimal number of footnotes, because according to Rummo "the book is understandable" without extensive commentaries.

== Eastern Europe ==
=== Russian ===
Soviet authorities considered Ulysses unsuitable for Soviet readers, making translation attempts dangerous, particularly in the 1930s; multiple fragments were translated and published despite this. Karl Radek harshly criticized Joyce during the first All-Union Congress of Soviet Writers in 1934: "A pile of dung teeming with worms, photographed with a cinema apparatus through a microscope – that's Joyce."

Vladimir Nabokov sent a letter to Joyce, proposing to work on translation, but did not receive an answer. Several early translators met tragic ends. Valentin Stenich, who published his translation of episodes four to six in 1935–1936, was arrested and executed in 1938. Ivan Kashkin's First Translators' Collective of the Union of Soviet Writers published their translation of the first ten episodes in 1935–1936. The most significant contribution was by Igor Romanovich; he was arrested and died in Gulag in 1942. Victor Khinkis started to translate the book in 1972; he died in 1981 from illness and alcoholism before completing his work.

The first complete Russian translation finally appeared in 1989 in the journal "Foreign Literature" (Inostrannaya Literatura); Khinkis's translation was completed by his friend, physicist Sergey Khoruzhiy, who had no previous experience in translation or knowledge of Joyce. A debate emerged over how much of the final translation should be attributed to each translator. According to Khoruzhiy, he tried to complete Khinkis work, but eventually started to translate from scratch. It was published in a book form in 1993, and included over a hundred pages of commentaries. The first edition of 50,000 copies was quickly sold, and the next edition doubled it.

=== Belarusian ===
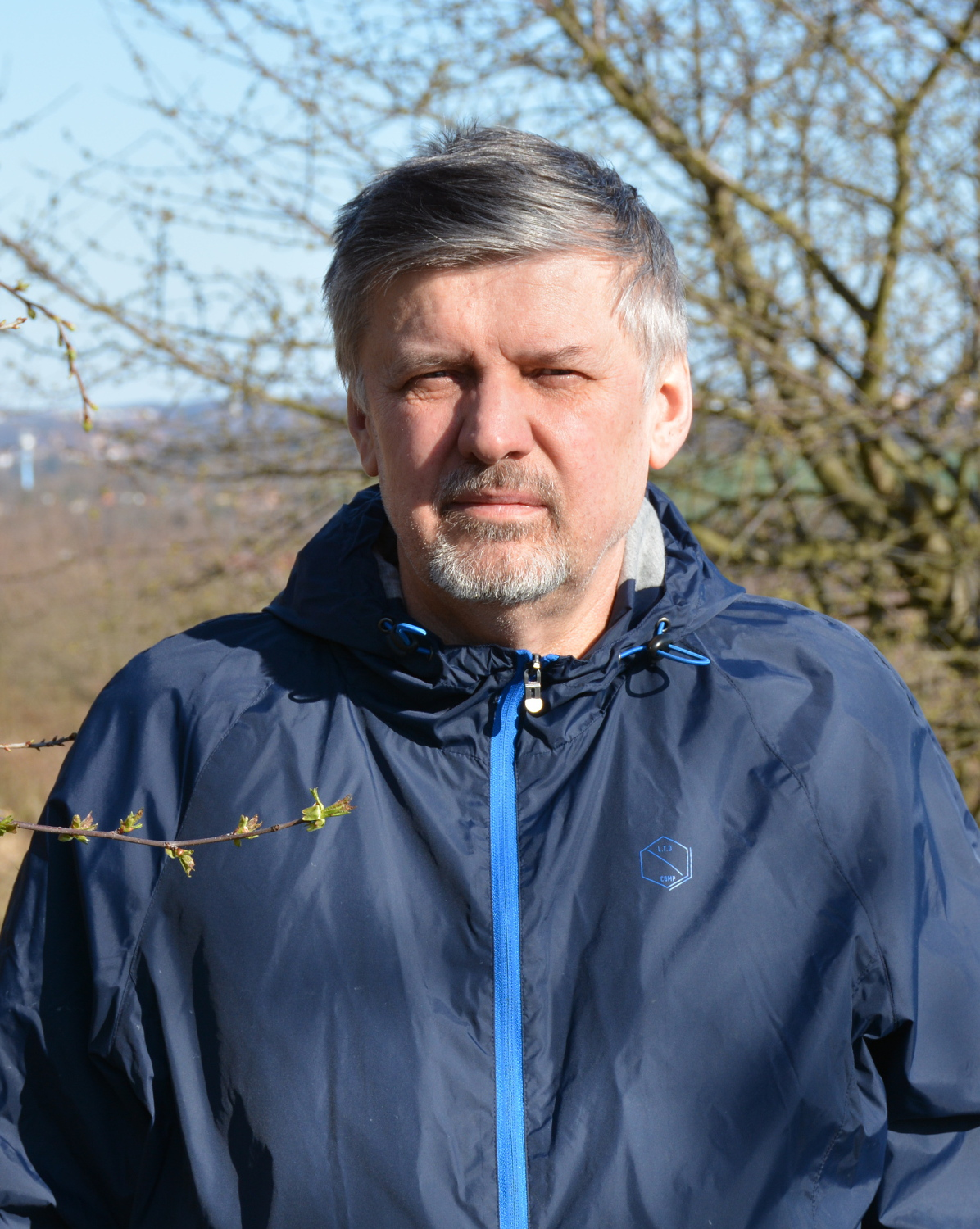
Jan Maksymiuk

Jan Maksymiuk, an ethnic Belarusian from Poland, who had a background in physics and no formal training in English philology, began translating Ulysses into Belarusian around 1984–1985. He initially produced nine episodes on a rare Belarusian-font typewriter in 1988; he photocopied ten copies that reached Belarus before full Russian translation was published. He cited the vital role of a knowledgeable editor with strong Belarusian and English skills and the usefulness of reference works like Ulysses Annotated. The political atmosphere in Belarus complicated distribution, so 1000 copies were published with funding secured in Warsaw in 1993. Only 700 of these sold in Minsk, partly because few Belarusians actively read the language at a sophisticated level; "the remaining 300 copies were still kept under his bed in 1998".

According to Maksymiuk, his physics training shaped his "discipline of thought", which he applied to solving translation problems, while his self-taught English skills meant he focused especially on excellence in Belarusian. His journalistic work, including four years spent translating post-Soviet newspapers for the American Embassy, slowed progress on Ulysses but provided professional experience; he also completed translations into Polish and started work on Witkiewicz's Insatiability. He planned to finish Ulysses when he can devote steady time to it, hoping one day to issue a second part – though jokingly suggesting an edition of only 50 copies. Maksymiuk did not expect any success in distribution: 'You see, one has to take a proportional view, that is, to take into account how many people at the moment indeed routinely use Belarusian in Belarus ... Nominally, there are 10 million Belarusians, yes? As for those who speak Belarusian, use this language for the most part and are able to read on the level on which Ulysses is written, with all its phraseology and vocabulary, I think that they account for some 0.1% It's some 10,000 people."

Maksymiuk used old dictionaries of Belarusian and his knowledge of Old Church Slavonic to translate Joyce's neologisms, and invented words when he couldn't find equivalents. Piotr Kuhiwczak described the Maksymiuk's translation as "miraculous" and "one of the most important cultural events since the end of the Soviet Union"; he writes that it "was more than a simple literary translation; it was an attempt to recover the potential which the Belarussian language has lost".

=== Ukrainian ===
Fragments of Ulysses first appeared in Ukrainian in 1966, when Oleksandr Terekh published translations of Episodes 4, 6, and part of Episode 18 in the journal Vsesvit. A complete translation was prevented during the Soviet period, "due to the lack of thorough research, poor international contacts and, ultimately, inaccessibility of the major precedent text – the Bible – which was strictly prohibited". Terekh worked on the translation for nearly fifty years before it was completed by Oleksandr Mokrovolskyi after Ukraine gained independence. The first complete Ukrainian Ulysses was published by Vydavnytstvo Zhupanskoho in 2015.

== Caucasus and Central Asia ==
=== Georgian ===
A Shakespeare scholar Nico Kiasashvili, the head of the English Department at the Tbilisi State University, began to publish his translation of Ulysses in 1971. The first ten episodes appeared in literary magazines between 1971 and 1983, when they were collected into a book. The remaining eight episodes were published in Mnatobi magazine in 1998–1999, with the complete version finally appearing in 2012, edited by his daughter, Maya Kiasashvili.

The translation posed multiple challenges: Georgian lacks equivalents for European nobility and clergy titles due to different social and religious traditions, requiring Kiasashvili to either invent new words or borrow directly from English (i.e. 'yeomen'). For "Oxen of the Sun" he addressed stylistic challenges by using archaic Georgian letters, unused in the modern language, to capture historical language variations.

Kiasashvili faced resistance from the publisher over his non-traditional Georgian usage, but insisted on retaining these elements to stay true to Joyce's text. He consulted multiple translations in various languages, using dictionaries to access versions in languages he did not know.

In response to the translation of Ulysses into Georgian, Murman Jguburia wrote a poem titled "Now Ulysses Has No Readers":

Joyce's novel has no readers
Though the edition is large,
The housewife chops the vegetables
And like a mirage,
Tbilisi is seen in the twilight,
And the Holy Mountain is clouded,
Strange is the fate of Ulysses
Rendered into Georgian.
The book is drowsing calmly,
Though some readers get nervous,
It is the sleepy decoration
And something very contemplative.
...

=== Uzbek ===
In 2008, the first Uzbek translation by Ibrohim Gʻafurov was published. The book was translated from Russian version by Khinkis and Khoruzhij, and not from the original text.

=== Armenian ===
Armenian translation by Samvel Mkrtchyan was published in two volumes in 2012. His widow, Naira Zohrabyan, commented that "this work received complete indifference".

== Balkans ==
=== Serbo-Croatian ===
Ulysses was translated twice into Croatian dialect, by Zlatko Gorjan in 1957 and Luko Paljetak in 1991, and once into Serbian dialect, by Zoran Paunović in 2001. Gorjan's translation was called "excellent", and noted that he "managed to recreate the atmosphere of the original text". Gorjan self-censored sexually implicit words: i.e. "cock" was translated as "member" and not with direct equivalent. The Czech translator Aloys Skoumal wrote that Gorjan's translation was done in just eight months and had multiple omissions, sometimes of the whole sentences. Gorjan himself admitted that he tried to "capture the spirit" of the book, and was less concerned with precise translation.

=== Slovene ===
The Slovenian translation of Ulysses was done by Janez Gradišnik, published in two volumes by Državna založba Slovenije. The first volume containing chapters 1–13 appeared in April 1967, followed by the second volume in October 1968. The publisher had strong commitment to the project, even funding Gradišnik's research trip to Ireland where he established contacts who helped him resolve difficult passages through correspondence.

The translation had comprehensive commentary. Gradišnik was awarded the Prešeren Foundation Prize in 1968. In 1993, Gradišnik, then 81, produced a revised edition that incorporated corrections from Hans Walter Gabler's critical edition and suggestions from Joyce scholar John Kidd. Gradišnik noted that through these revisions, many passages gained their proper meaning in Slovenian for the first time.

=== Albanian ===
Idlir Azizaj translated the book into Albanian in 2003. Before that, he wrote a thesis on Ulysses. He received an award for his translation from the Albanian Ministry of Culture in 2004.

=== Bulgarian ===
The first Bulgarian translation of Ulysses was completed by Iglika Vassileva and published in 2004, achieving "tremendous success" with three thousand copies sold in less than a month.

Vassileva, an experienced translator, spent three years in intensive, uninterrupted work on the translation, approaching it "as if it was a canonized text, a deeply encoded text." She noted that the project required her to "lift our language, to expand it, to shift it for the purposes of the narrative, to encode it, decode it and recode it", particularly challenging given Bulgarian's relatively conservative linguistic nature. She also noted a small gap between the emergence of Bulgarian literature and Ulyssess: the first Bulgarian novel, Ivan Vazov's Under the Yoke, appeared in 1894, less than 30 years before Ulysses. Per Vassileva, "Ulysses is an urban, an encyclopaedic, multi-layered work and a very hermetic text – a phenomenon unknown in our literature."

Vassileva observed that during the translation "the Bulgarian language suddenly revealed a potential I never suspected in it before". Her approach positioned the translator as a "language-builder", stretching the capabilities of Bulgarian to accommodate Joyce's complex linguistic innovations. Particularly challenging was Joyce's use of Hiberno-English. Vassileva described her work as a readable yet faithful translation that "doesn't sound bad, once I've spent a couple of days on a page."

=== Macedonian ===
Marija Girevska was commissioned to translate Ulysses to Macedonian in 2012. The book was divided into two volumes, published in June and December 2013. The translation has 2717 footnotes. Girevska used Gabler's edition as a source, together with Gifford's and Slote's annotated editions; she noted that it was "quite difficult to create ambivalent meaning or create homonyms or homophones as they are quite rare" in Macedonian.

In 2013, Girevska was awarded the Golden Pen award for best translation.

== Middle East ==
=== Arabic ===
The first Arabic translations of Ulysses were done by the Egyptian author Muhammad Loutfi Goumah, publishing under the title «عولس» ("Aulis") in 1947; Goumah translated the first ten of the novel's eighteen episodes. It was published in 2008 by the National Center for Translation, edited by his son, Rabeh Loutfi Goumah.

The first full translation into Arabic was made by Egyptian professor Taha Mahmoud Taha. He published his translation of the fourth and tenth chapters in 1964 and 1965. In 1961, Taha got his PhD in the University of Dublin, and wrote a thesis on Aldous Huxley. In 1975, he wrote Encyclopedia of James Joyce in Arabic. In 1968, he moved to Kuwait, and in 1978 the first draft of the full translation was ready, that was published in 1982. The revised and corrected edition was published in 1994. Taha later wrote that he "discovered that many of the existing dictionaries were not sufficient for the purpose, which forced me to compile my own dictionary, with all the hardship and effort that entailed, of synonyms and antonyms."

Iraqi poet Salah Niazi criticized Taha's translation, and started to work on his own in 1984 to distract himself from Iraq-Iran war, while living in exile in London. It was published in three volumes in 2001, 2010, and 2014. The first two volumes were published in Damascus, the third one in Beirut. The final volume is still unpublished.

According to a study, both translators primarily used literal translation with minimal changes, focusing on form rather than content. Niazi occasionally added footnotes, while Taha Mahmoud used no footnotes at all.

In 2023, Amir Hlayyil, a Lebanese Maronite ethnographer and poet from Kfarshima, produced a Lebanese Arabic translation of the final excerpt of the eighteenth episode, Penelope. In translating intertextual motifs and the names of games, Hlayyil consulted reference works by Don Gifford and Robert J. Seidman’s 1989 Ulysses Annotated: Notes for James Joyce’s Ulysses and W. Thornton's 1973 Allusions in Ulysses; A Line-by-Line Reference to Joyce’s Complex Symbolism. It was published in Göttingen in 2024 by Vandenhoeck & Ruprecht.

=== Hebrew ===
Yael Renan's translation was published in 1985 by Hotsaat Mahbarot Le-Sifrut. The work was done in twelve years. According to David Shulman, the translation is "vastly superior to the original". Renan wrote about the difficulties in translation of slang into Hebrew: she noted "the relative poverty of Hebrew in both vocabulary and stylistic differentiation", as there is almost no slang in Hebrew and no "colloquial style" different from the formal rules prescribed by the Academy of the Hebrew Language. The largest issue, per Renan, was "the lack of a continuous history of Hebrew literature", that made it hard to adequately translate historical styles in "Oxen of the Sun".

=== Turkish ===
Ulysses was translated into Turkish twice, first by Nevzat Erkmen in 1996, and then by Armağan Ekici in 2012. Ekici found the first translation to be "cold and unreadable", and stated that his goal for the new translation was "to make the Turkish readers realise the richness, humanity and humour of the book."

According to Ekici, Erkmen "approaches Ulysses as a dictionary-and-puzzle man: he used to be the captain of the Turkish team that competed in the World Puzzle Championships, and he also wrote puzzle books; he is the author of the only rhyming dictionary of Turkish"; he also frequently used words from Ottoman Turkish, that were natural to the translator born in 1931, but are unknown for modern audience.

In his translation Ekici used multiple sources to deal with Joycean wordplay: "I looked for analogous registers in Turkish (a pompous newspaper article, sports reporting, bad puns, bad novels in the vein of Sweets of Sin, nationalistic propaganda, legal text, political speech, soldiers swearing, occult writing, masonic ritual, girls' magazine, anti-Semitic language, blackface jokes, Gypsy slang, folk idioms...) and I used the colours and phrases of such texts in rendering such parodies."

Ekici also used well-known existing translations for Joyce's references to the Bible, Shakespeare, and Homer: the 1941 edition of the Turkish Bible; Sabahattin Eyüboğlu's Shakespeare, and Azra Erhat's Homer. Instead of Ottoman Turkish of the first translation, new one employed "modern, colloquial Turkish and slang". Ekici also noted that while "the original texts are timeless ... translations grow old".

=== Persian ===
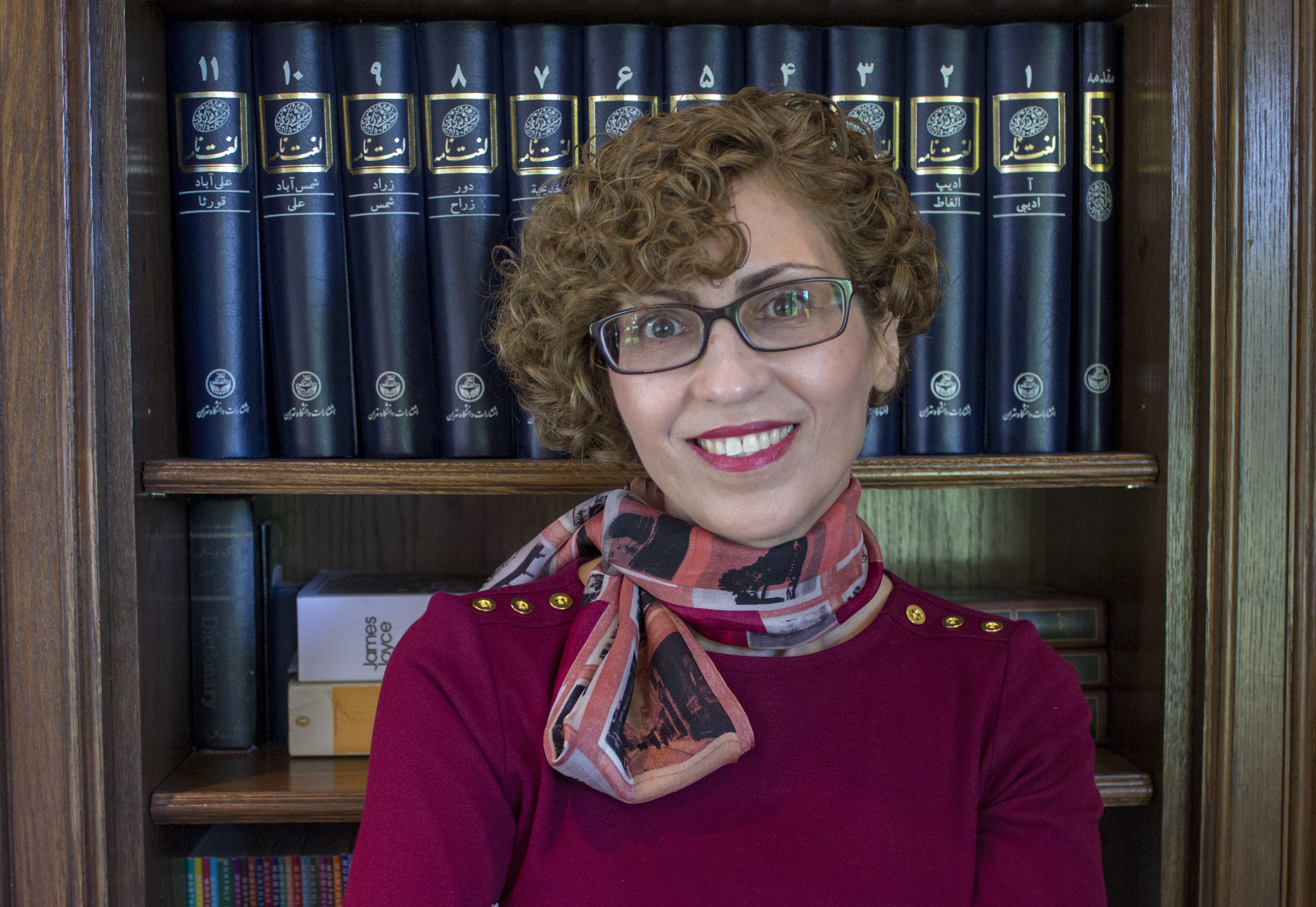
Akram Pedramnia

The first Persian translation of Ulysses was done by Akram Pedramnia, an Iranian-Canadian translator. Since the book contains content prone to censorship in Iran (including sex, politics, religion, and LGBTQ), it cannot be published there. Instead of creating a censored version, Pedramnia chose to translate the complete text.

The first volume was published in the UK and is distributed in Iran through underground networks. The translation received grants from Literature Ireland and the Zurich James Joyce Foundation. While facing technical challenges in translating Joyce's complex language into Persian, Pedramnia also deals with government attempts to block the work's distribution, even online.

The first volume (episodes 1 to 6) is available for free online.

=== Kurdish ===
Kurdish translation was published in 2023 by poet and translator Kawa Nemir, who started the project in 2012 to "draw attention to a language that had been the victim of nationalist politics in Turkey" and to counter the notion that Kurdish was an "inferior language". The translation was called "a tremendous act of activism for the Kurdish language", with Nemir himself calling the translation a "revenge story" on Turkish state, and described as working "at the frontlines of language – rescuing it, broadening it, or allowing it to reach new depths". Nemir's work, influenced by his self-gathered notebooks of Kurdish expressions, required him to coin words unavailable in existing dictionaries, especially terminology related to the sea. He described Kurdish as "close to Old English" in terms of syntax, making the linguistic transition more intuitive. He also drew upon sources such as 17th-century Kurdish poetry (notably Ehmedê Xanî's Mem û Zîn) to render older literary styles in chapters like "Oxen of the Sun", which features shifting registers of English. Because Kurdistan is landlocked, aquatic references (fish and sea life) were especially challenging. The term "whale-path", encountered in Beowulf, prompted him to note "rêka nehengan" ("whale-road") as a Kurdish equivalent. The work was done in Kurmanji dialect.

Besides searching dictionaries like Ferhenga Biwêjan a mezin, Nemir relied on colloquial usage, consulting prisoners in Mardin for phrases about drinking and gambling. He recorded "bûye pilot", a term describing "someone ready for action in all hours of the day", to represent the alcoholic decline of Bob Doran. Frequent political unrest compelled him to move from Diyarbakır to Mardin for safety; after 2015, ongoing conflict prompted him to depart Turkey. A documentary film about his work, Translating Ulysses, was refused screening in Turkey. As of 2023, Nemir continued drafting a Kurdish readers' guide to Ulysses, including references and a detailed preface, while maintaining that the distinctive grammar of Kurdish qualifies it for the full linguistic complexity of Joyce's text.

== East Asia ==
=== Korean ===
The first Korean translation of Ulysses by Kim Chong-Keon was published in 1968. Kim spent seven years on it, following his master's degree in 1962. The translation faced significant linguistic challenges due to the differences between Korean and English. Hangul has 8 vowels and 16 consonants; the sentence structure in Korean is nearly opposite to English. Particular difficulties arose in translating the varying styles of episodes like "Oxen of the Sun". While Chinese characters incorporated into Hangul could sometimes help convey meaning through their visual effect, finding equivalent Korean dialects and slang proved challenging. The translator aimed for word-for-word translation of approximately 3,000 words from the original text, the challenge that he described as "almost an impossibility". Kim retranslated it in 1988.

A second complete Korean translation was made by Kim Seong-suk and published in two volumes by Dongseo Munhwasa in 2011. Kim, a graduate of the Department of English Language and Literature at Yonsei University, began studying and translating Ulysses in 1955 under the guidance of literary scholar Choe Jae-seo. According to the translator's biographical note, she decided at that time to devote herself to the study and translation of the novel, founded an "Ulysses Society" in 1960, and published her translation 55 years later. The translation was reissued in 2016. A later comparison published on the appearance of Lee Jong-il's translation characterized Kim's version as more readable than Kim Chong-keon's, but also as considerably freer in its treatment of the original, at times dividing Joyce's long sentences into shorter Korean ones.

A third complete translation, by Joyce scholar Lee Jong-il, was published in two volumes by Munhakdongne on 8 December 2023. Lee studied English literature at Seoul National University, received an MA from the University of Leicester and a doctorate from the University of Essex, taught at Sejong University, and served as president of the Korean James Joyce Society. He first attempted to read Ulysses while studying in Britain and later wrote his thesis on it. He began translating the book in the autumn of 1998. The translation was published about twenty-five years after he had begun. Lee said that his aim was not word-for-word literalism but to preserve the purpose of Joyce's stylistic variations in natural Korean. His translation has no extensive annotations, notes immediately necessary to following the narrative are placed alongside the text.

=== Chinese ===
The translator Jin Di translated one episode in Chinese in 1981, and several other episodes in 1986 and 1988.

In 1990, Yilin Press commissioned writer and translator Xiao Qian and his wife, translator Wen Jieruo, to translate Ulysses into Chinese. Xiao's early interest in Joyce dated back to his postgraduate studies at Cambridge. In 1946, Xiao visited Joyce's grave in Zurich, and remarked: "Here lies the corpse of someone who wasted his great talents writing something very unreadable." After the translation work was done, Xiao called it "quite monumental". The translation, in two volumes, was published in April and October 1994. It was completed around the same time as the full translation by Jin Di.

Translation to the Chinese was challenging due to the rules of the language, Chinese and English are very different and present a case of "immense linguistic incompatibility". Mandarin allows "only 404 possible phonetic combinations"; wordplay is hard to translate because of ideographic nature of Chinese; Chinese is a tonal language; and proper names are rarely translated "syllable for syllable". The husband and wife team started to work on their translation in October 1990. They used multiple sources for the translation: "Gifford's annotated Ulysses ... consulted the Chinese Catholic Church, foreign-language specialists, geologists, doctors, and others for specialized knowledge. The Irish Embassy helped with specifically Irish references." "Joycean quirks" were explained in 5,991 footnotes.

Wang Yougui considered the both translations to be "the translations of the century", and compares this achievement with "Zhu Shenghao and Liang Shiqiu, who translated the complete works of William Shakespeare, and Yang Xianyi and Gladys Yang, who rendered A Dream of Red Mansions into English". Yougui also recognizes Ulysses to be "the Mount Everest of English literature", writing that its translator should be as brave as climbers who go to its peak.

Xiao and Wen tried to create a "reader-friendly" book, and strived to make it comprehensible to the reader. Jin Di wanted his translation to be as accurate as possible and faithful to the original. Comparing the two translations, Wang writes:

What then are the differences between the two? On the whole, Xiao and Wen's translation is refined but deficient in depth, while Jin's version is lean but does not lack in vigor. Xiao and Wen's is easy to read, occasionally embellished with some wonderful touches, yet Jin's text, though "elegance" is sacrificed for "faithfulness," still reads smoothly. Xiao and Wen's, executed in a more stylized manner, is flowery, colorful, and tailored to different tastes. Jin's version is a little stiff in some places in its first episode but gradually is smoothed out wonderfully. In a way, these two versions seem to be engaged in antiphonal song, competing with each other through their own strengths and weaknesses. Sometimes one finds a passage of three or four lines better executed in one version; then one finds a superior passage in the other. In Xiao and Wen's translation, there are many additions, paraphrases, and substitutions, while Jin, in contrast, sticks with the original very closely. Xiao and Wen's is more daring and straightforward, full of cutting and chopping, paring and peeling, but for the most part finely cut and patched in the right places. ... Xiao and Wen's is more dashing, Jin's more restrained.

Jin's translation became popular in Taiwan, while Xiao and Wen's is better known in the Mainland China. Both translations were awarded the national prize for foreign literature by China's Press and Publication Bureau – Xiao and Wen in 1995 and Jin in 1998. In 1994, 85,000 copies of Xiao and Wen's first volume were sold in China; the second and third editions followed in 1995. Xiao viewed the translation as China's re-opening, writing "I feel that this translation of Ulysses signifies that China at last has opened herself not only in technology and science but also in literature".

The third translation by Liu Xiangyu was published in 2021. In his translation, Liu wanted to "make detailed interpretation on Irish history and culture". Liu spent twenty years on translation.

=== Mongolian ===
The first Mongolian translation of Ulysses (Үлисс) was published in Ulaanbaatar in 2009, translated by Onon Chinbayar. Chinbayar first attempted to translate the book in 2001, producing five pages before abandoning the project for six years. He worked from Khoruzhy's Russian translation, checking some passages against the original English text. He later wrote that he encountered more than 10,000 words that he found unclear or unfamiliar. Chinbayar noted that his earlier study of Old Church Slavonic helped him to understand "Oxen of the Sun" in the Russian translation. He reported spending about one year and eight months on the translation, working 12–14 hours a day. The translation received the 2009 Altan Öd ("Golden Feather") award for literary translation. Chinbayar subsequently revised his translation, and the new edition was published in 2019.

== India ==
=== Malayalam ===
Chitra Panikkar, who interpreted the book as a postcolonial text, translated seven chapters of Ulysses to Malayalam, which were published in the Keralakavita journal in 1990–2002.

The first complete Malayalam translation of Ulysses by N. Moosakkutty was published in 2012. Moosakkutty, who had translated more than a hundred books, later described Ulysses as the most difficult book he worked on, mentioning Joyce's shifts between Victorian prose, epic, drama, journalism, popular fiction, catechistic question-and-answer and stream of consciousness styles. The translation has more than 4,000 explanatory notes. He regarded the final episode, "Penelope", as the most challenging, particularly because of Molly Bloom's largely unpunctuated monologue. The translation received the Kerala Sahitya Akademi Award for Translation for 2013.
