= Antônio Houaiss =

Brazilian lexicographer (1915–1999)

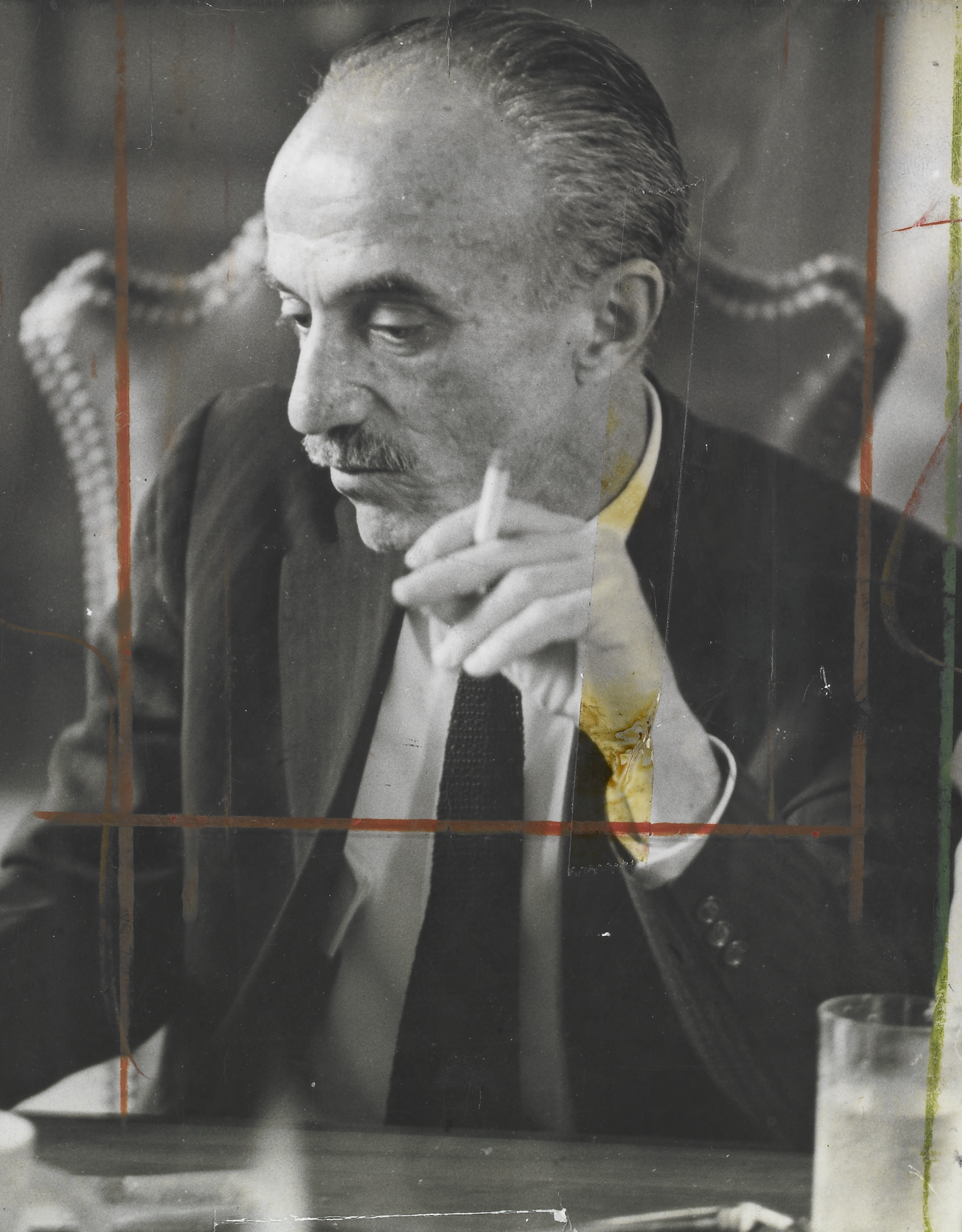
- Houaiss in 1970
- Born: October 15, 1915; Rio de Janeiro
- Died: March 7, 1999 (aged 83); Rio de Janeiro
- Occupations: Lexicographer, writer, translator
- Known for: Houaiss Dictionary of the Portuguese Language

Antônio Houaiss (Brazilian Portuguese: [ˈwajs] or [ˈuajs]; October 15, 1915 – March 7, 1999) was a Brazilian lexicographer, diplomat, writer and translator.

== Early life ==
The son of Lebanese immigrants, he was born in Rio de Janeiro.

== Career ==
Houaiss began his career in Rio de Janeiro as a professor of the Portuguese language, of which he eventually became a recognized authority. He left teaching in 1945 for the diplomatic service and served the Brazilian government as such until the 1964 military coup, when he was forced to retire with loss of political rights. During that period he was Brazilian vice-consul and representative to the United Nations in Geneva, Switzerland (1947 to 1949); third secretary of the Brazilian Embassy in the Dominican Republic (1949 to 1951) and in Athens, Greece (1951 to 1953); member of the permanent Brazilian delegation to the United Nations in New York City (1960 to 1964).

After leaving the diplomatic career he worked briefly as editor of the Brazilian newspaper Correio da Manhã (1964 to 1965). He joined the Brazilian Academy of Philology in 1960 and was elected a fellow of the exclusive Brazilian Academy of Letters in 1971, which he presided in 1996. He was the chief editor of the Brazilian encyclopedia Mirador. In 1990 he received the Moinho Santista Award. For 11 months, in 1992 and 1993, he served as the Minister of Culture under President Itamar Franco.

He was also one of the chief proponents of the international unification for the orthography of Portuguese, a project that he had joined in 1985, and led to the 1990 spelling reform treaty, which he too did not live to see implemented.

== Published works ==
He is the author of several books and many essays, commentaries and articles on linguistics and other subjects. He is best known for his 1966 translation of James Joyce's Ulysses, and for supervising with Mauro de Salles Villar the creation of the Dicionário Houaiss da Língua Portuguesa, one of the major reference dictionaries for the Portuguese language. The dictionary, which he started compiling in 1985, was completed and published (with more than 220,000 entries) only after his death, in 2001. The Antônio Houaiss Institute was created in 1997 to continue that work.
