= Enciclopédia Mirador Internacional =

Brazilian encyclopedia

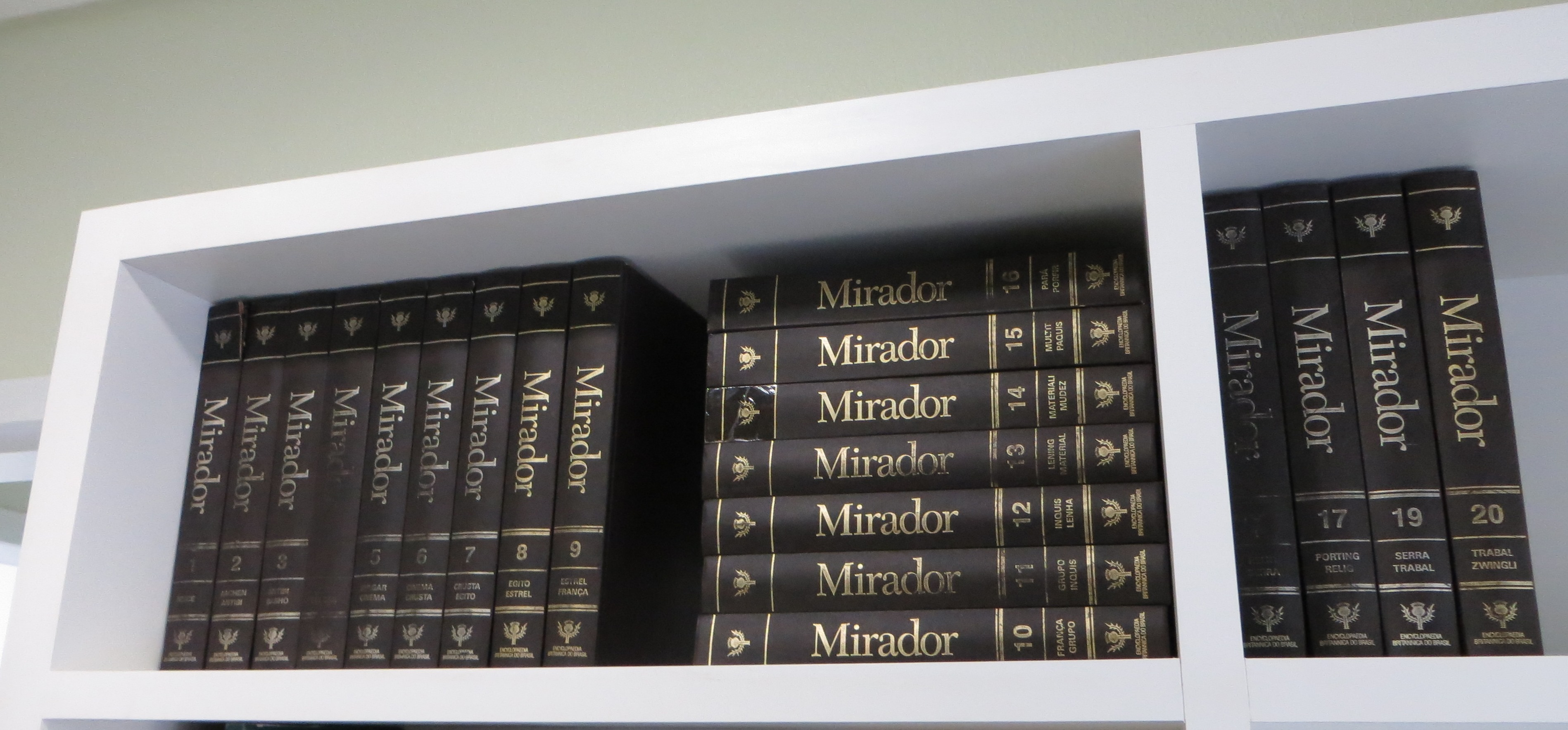
A Mirador encyclopedia set

The Enciclopédia Mirador Internacional is a discontinued Portuguese-language general knowledge encyclopedia, first published in 1976 in Brazil. Consisting of 20 volumes, it was produced by Companhia Melhoramentos with financial support from Encyclopaedia Britannica do Brasil, which held its publication rights. The lexicographer Antônio Houaiss served as editor-in-chief of the project.

Mirador Internacional spans the natural sciences, mathematics, and the humanities, with a focus on literature and literary criticism. The entries were authored by specialists, including Otto Maria Carpeaux, Antonio Candido, Alfredo Bosi, and Sábato Magaldi. The year prior to its release, the encyclopedia was awarded the Prêmio Jabuti for editorial production.

Compared to the more popular Enciclopédia Barsa, written primarily for didactic use in schools, Mirador Internacional contained more extensive, dense, and detailed entries, generally intended for academic use. Alongside the Enciclopédia Barsa and the Enciclopédia Delta-Larousse, it is considered one of the major general-knowledge encyclopedic works published in 20th-century Brazil.
