= Houaiss Dictionary of the Portuguese Language =

2001 dictionary by Antônio Houaiss

Dicionário Houaiss da Língua Portuguesa
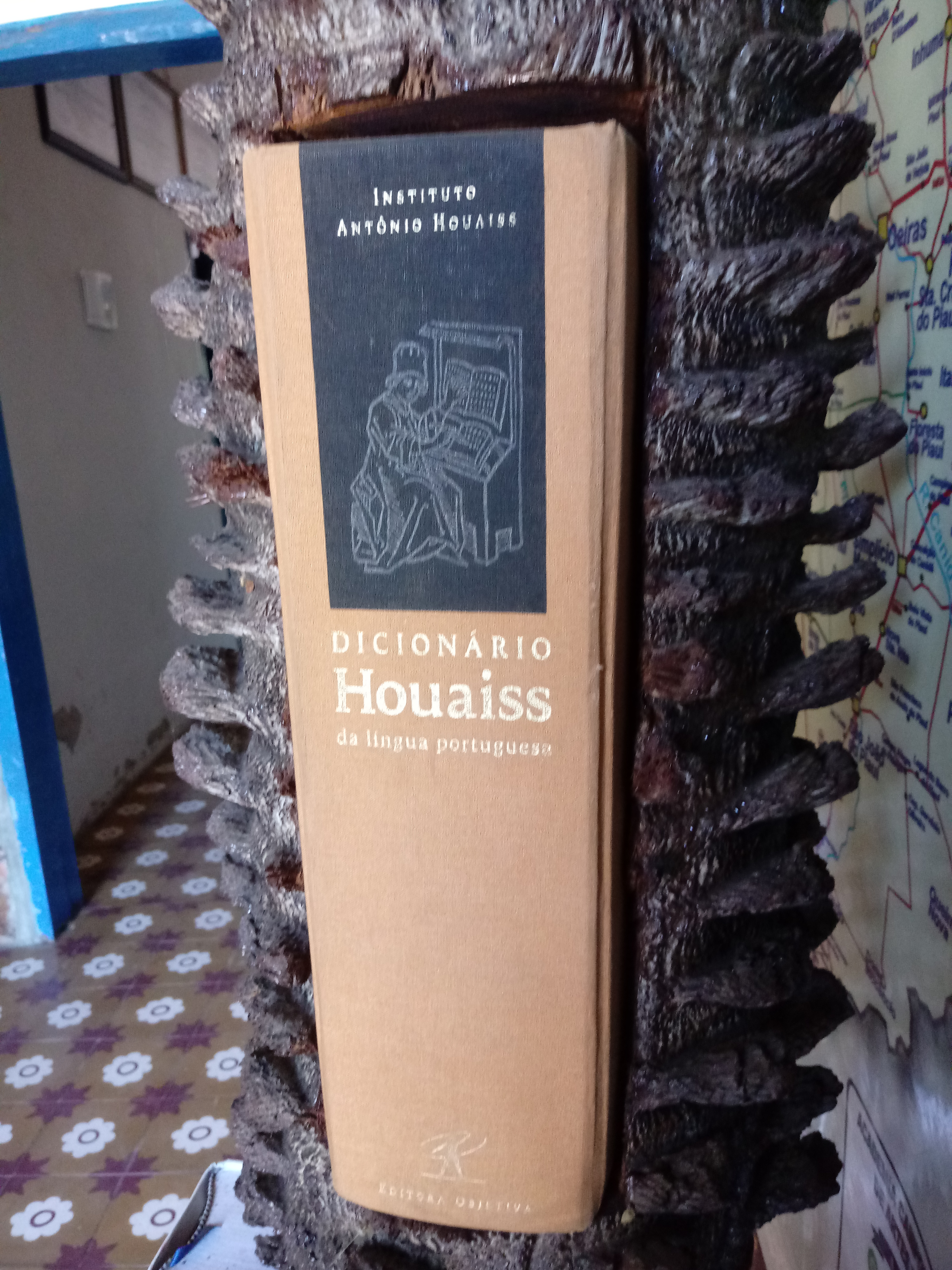
- Dictionary spine
- Editor: Antônio Houaiss
- Language: Portuguese
- Subject: Portuguese language
- Genre: Dictionary
- Published: 2001
- Publication place: Brazil
- Website: Official website

The Dicionário Houaiss da Língua Portuguesa is a dictionary for the Portuguese language, which was compiled by the Brazilian lexicographer Antônio Houaiss. Conceived as a lusophone reference work, it aims to provide the most complete record of Portuguese vocabulary worldwide and is regarded as one of the most ambitious lexicographical projects undertaken in the language.

== History ==
The project was conceived in 1985 by Brazilian philologist, diplomat, and lexicographer Antônio Houaiss, who aimed to produce the most comprehensive dictionary of the Portuguese language. The initiative envisioned a "General Dictionary of the Portuguese Language" that would document vocabulary used across Europe, Latin America, Africa, and Asia.

Work advanced for eight years until 1992, when it was suspended due to financial difficulties. The project resumed in 1995 through a partnership between the institute Antônio Houaiss of Lexicografia and the publisher Editora Objetiva, with the support of the institute's director Francisco Melo Franco and chief lexicographer Mauro Villar. A large editorial team was assembled, consisting of about 140 to 150 specialists, including lexicographers, etymologists, redactors, professors, daters, and reviewers from Brazil, Portugal, Angola, and East Timor.

Houaiss died on 7 March 1999, after 15 years of work, with approximately 70 percent of the dictionary completed. To guide completion of the work, Houaiss left behind a detailed hundred-page editorial manual. The remaining portion was finalized by the editorial team, aided by a computerized database that facilitated coordination.

The first edition of the Dicionário Houaiss da Língua Portuguesa was published in the second half of 2001. The volume contained about 228,500 entries, 382,000 definitions, 415,500 synonyms, and 26,400 antonyms, exceeding other dictionaries in scale by tens of thousands of entries. Compared to the Aurélio and Michaelis dictionaries, it offered substantially more lexical material, with estimates suggesting it contained 93 percent more information than its closest competitor. The dictionary was conceived as a lusophone work, recording regional Portuguese vocabulary from Brazil, the Azores, Portugal, Madeira, East Timor, Macau, Angola, Mozambique, Cape Verde, Guinea-Bissau, and São Tomé and Príncipe. Approximately 45,000 entries were of Nheengatu or Tupi origin. In addition to linguistic material, the work was encyclopedic, covering scientific, artistic, and humanistic topics, as well as biographical entries.

Physically, the 2001 edition was a single volume of 3,008 pages, weighing 3.8 kilograms. It was printed in Italy, as no Brazilian publisher had the technical means to produce such a large volume. The project involved investments of about R$7,000,000 from the Institute Antônio Houaiss and R$4,200,000 from the publisher Objetiva. Innovations included systematic recording of the earliest known usage of words, documentation of semantic evolution, and full conjugation information for more than 15,000 verbs. It also provided lists of Greek and Latin formants for users interested in the creation of neologisms.

A version adapted to European Portuguese was developed in Lisbon under the direction of João Malaca Casteleiro, with Brazilian usage presented as supplementary information, reversing the presentation of the Brazilian edition. A CD-ROM version was planned immediately after the print launch, as was an advanced school version, to be launched on October and November, respectively. In January 2003, companion volumes were published, including one for synonyms and antonyms, Dicionário Houaiss – Sinônimos e Antônimos, and another for the conjugation of verbs and use of prepositions, Dicionário Houaiss Verbos – Conjugação e Uso de Preposições.

The electronic version, known as the Dicionário Eletrônico Houaiss (DEH), was released in the early 2000s and became widely used. It introduced hypertext navigation and offered multiple modes of consultation, including traditional, express, and interactive views. An online edition was launched on the Brazilian web portal Universo Online in August 2004, granting subscribers access to the full content of the dictionary. In 2005, the Portuguese newspaper Diário de Notícias distributed a multi-volume edition in Portugal. A specialized edition on Música Popular Brasileira (a Brazilian music genre), the Dicionário Houaiss Ilustrado da Música Popular Brasileira, appeared in 2006 in partnership with the cultural Institute Cravo Albin, containing 5,322 entries. A condensed edition of about 146,000 entries was issued in 2009, adapted to reflect the changes introduced by the Orthographic Agreement of 1990. Since then, the online edition has continued to be updated, with new words such as mensalão and mensaleiro added on 4 December 2012 after the political scandal of the same name. Chief lexicographer Villar stated that the main criterion for the inclusion of new entries is the number of online references a word receives. According to him, once a term reaches a fixed threshold of occurrences, it is considered for inclusion, although he did not disclose the minimum number required and noted that additional criteria are also taken into account.

== Reception ==
On its release, it was immediately recognized as a milestone in Portuguese lexicography for its breadth and international orientation. Dieter Messner, a linguist and specialist in the field, argued that it could be compared to the best dictionaries of other Romance languages, surpassing some of them in several respects. The Brazilian newspaper Estadão emphasized the dictionary's unprecedented scope, describing it as "a release to create a new concept" and highlighting the "breadth and precision of each entry". However, its reviewer also noted the sacrifices that came with these innovations, pointing out that it "does not present literary quotations, that is, examples of the use of words by writers, as its competitors still do".

In February 2012, the Federal Public Ministry (MPF) in Uberlândia, Minas Gerais, filed a public civil action against publisher Objetiva and the institute Antônio Houaiss de Lexicografia, requesting the suspension of publication and circulation of the dictionary. The MPF argued that the dictionary contained pejorative and discriminatory definitions of the word cigano ('gypsy'), which it considered offensive to Brazil's Romani population, estimated at around 600,000 people. The action originated from a 2009 complaint by Cleiber Fernandes Machado, a Brazilian of Romani descent, who alleged that Portuguese-language dictionaries portrayed his ethnic group in a prejudiced manner. The MPF sought the recall of all editions containing the contested definitions and requested R$200,000 in collective moral damages, claiming the publication harmed the dignity of the Romani community.

As a result of the action taken by the Public Prosecution Office of the State of Minas Gerais, the entry for cigano was temporarily removed from the electronic edition of the dictionary. In the current edition of the Houaiss Dictionary, the entry has been reinstated, and the contested definitions have been retained, as has the explanation (in place since 2008) regarding the uses of the word cigano with a derogatory connotation: "they result from an old European tradition, pejorative and xenophobic because it is based on erroneous and preconceived ideas about the characteristics of this people who, in the past, led a nomadic existence".

== See also ==
- Aurélio Dictionary – Portuguese dictionary
- Michaelis – Portuguese dictionary
