= José Salas Subirat =

Argentinian author, translator, insurance agent (1900–1975)

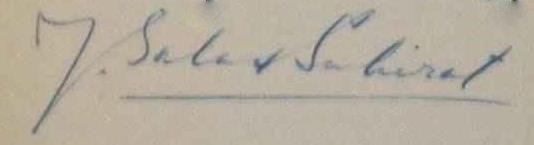
- Author Signature
- Born: 1900
- Died: 1975 (aged 74–75)
- Occupations: Writer, Translator, Insurance agent
- Writing career
- Language: Spanish
- Genres: Fiction, Poetry, Nonfiction, Translation
- Notable works: Las hélices del humo (poemas, 1942); Ulysses (Spanish translation, 1945)

José Salas Subirat (23 November 1900 – 29 May 1975), was an Argentinian insurance agent, writer, author of two novels, and books on insurance sales and self-help. He is known for writing the first complete Spanish translation of Ulysses by James Joyce.

== Translation of Ulysses ==
According to his biographer, Lucas Peterson, Salas Subirat could read English but could not speak it but still went about translating Ulysses as a sort of labor of love during his working commutes. He translated the entire novel for free, according to Peterson, and then it was published by the publisher Santiago Rueda in June 1945, “under the direction of Max Dickmann” with a cover “illustrated with a portrait of Joyce by Augustus John.”

Tim Fanning writes about how the translation was “galling” to the “Argentine literati” because the “translator of Joyce’s magnum opus was not a star of the Latin American literary scene, nor even a noted academic, but an insurance salesman, with little formal education, who had carried out the seemingly impossible task as a pastime.”

Borges, according to this article, said the translation was “terrible” but Gabriel García Marquez wrote this about the book:

“La única traducción que existe en castellano, en cambio, es casi inexistente. Pero su historia le sirve de excusa. La hizo para sí mismo, sólo por distraerse, el argentino J. Salas Subirat, que en la vida real era un experto en seguros de vida. El editor Santiago Rueda, de Buenos Aires, la descubrió en mala hora, y la publicó a fines de los años cuarenta. Por cierto, que a Salas Subirat lo conocí pocos años después en Caracas trepado en el escritorio anónimo de una compañía de seguros y pasando una tarde estupenda hablando de novelistas ingleses, que él conocía casi de memoria. La última vez que lo vi parece un sueño: estaba bailando, ya bastante mayor y más solo que nunca, en la rueda loca de los carnavales de Barranquilla. Fue una aparición tan extraña que no me decidí a saludarlo.”

Which roughly translates to:

“The only existing Spanish translation, however, is practically nonexistent. But its history serves as an excuse. It was done for himself, simply as a pastime, by the Argentinian J. Salas Subirat, who in real life was a life insurance expert. The Buenos Aires publisher Santiago Rueda discovered it at an inopportune moment and published it in the late 1940s. Incidentally, I met Salas Subirat a few years later in Caracas, perched on the anonymous desk of an insurance company, spending a wonderful afternoon talking about English novelists, whom he knew almost by heart. The last time I saw him seems like a dream: he was dancing, quite old by then and more alone than ever, in the frenetic carnival procession of Barranquilla. It was such a strange appearance that I didn't bring myself to greet him.”

== Reception and legacy ==
Scholar Norman Cheadle says that Salas Subirat's translation "was a signal event in the development of Argentine and even Spanish American literature."

In 2016, a biography of Salas Subirat by Lucas Petersen, El traductor del Ulises: Salas Subirat. La desconocida historia del argentino que tradujo la obra maestra de Joyce, was published by Sudamericana. Writing in The Irish Times in 2019, Petersen said that the story of Subirat's translation had become "one of the most talked-about stories among Latin American Joyceans and, of course, one of the landmarks in Spanish language translation history."

In a 2016 article titled “Biografía del primer traductor de Ulises,” writer and translator Pablo Ingberg described Petersen’s biography of Salas Subirat as “very well documented” and wrote that it deserved a place among the best biographies of its kind.

== Bibliography ==
- Bauzá, Hugo Francisco (2017). "Lo que el Ulises de Joyce debe a la Argentina". Revista Criterio (in Spanish).
- Brodersen, Juan (2 September 2016). "Salas Subirat: el ignoto traductor que logró lo imposible con el Ulises de Joyce". Clarín (in Spanish).
- Cutuli, Graciela (9 April 2020). "El traductor del Ulises". Hoja por Hoja (in Spanish).
- "En el 115 aniversario del Bloomsday: traducciones argentinas de Ulises de Joyce". La Voz (in Spanish). 16 June 2019.
- Gargatagli, Marietta (2002). "Datos para una biografía: José Salas Subirat". CVC Cervantes (in Spanish).
- Saer, Juan José (12 June 2004). El País (ed.). "El destino en español del Ulises". Babelia.
- Santa Cecilia, Carlos G. (1997). La recepción de James Joyce en la prensa española: 1921-1976. Sevilla: Universidad de Sevilla. ISBN 8447204030.
