= Zlatko Gorjan =

Croatian–Yugoslav translator and poet

- Born: 15 July 1901; Sremska Mitrovica, Croatia-Slavonia, Austria-Hungary
- Died: 21 June 1976 (aged 74); Zagreb, SR Croatia, Yugoslavia
- Occupations: Translator, poet, journalist

Zlatko Gorjan (15 July 1901 – 21 June 1976) was a notable Croatian and Yugoslav translator and poet.

Born in Sremska Mitrovica, Gorjan graduated from high school in Banja Luka in 1919. After studying German and French in Vienna and Zagreb he first started working in journalism, and also in film and theatre productions. He was editor at several foreign-language local papers, including Morgenblatt, Zagreber Tagblatt, Belgrader Zeitung, Der Morgen and Novosti, and was also local correspondent for foreign newspapers such as Prager Presse, Neue Zürcher Zeitung and Frankfurter Zeitung. In 1928 he edited a Zagreb-based theatre magazine titled Hrvatska pozornica ("The Croatian Stage") and he also worked as assistant to theatre directors Ivo Raić Lonjski and Branko Gavella.

From 1936 to 1940 Gorjan worked as dramaturge for Warner Bros. (after its acquisition of First National Pictures in 1936) in Zagreb. After the war Gorjan worked as editor at several Zagreb-based publishing companies, such as Prosvjeta, Matica hrvatska and Znanje. Gorjan was a founding member and president of the Croatian Literary Translators Association (DHKP), and in 1963 he was elected president of the International Federation of Translators (FIT), and was member of the editing board of the federation's scholarly journal Babel. Since 1973 he also edited the European edition of the American contemporary poetry magazine Rune, served as member of FIT Natthorst international translating award committee and was secretary of the Croatian PEN Center. In 1966 he was awarded the prestigious Herder Prize.

Gorjan wrote poetry, novellas and essays but is best known for his translating work - in his career he translated some 150 works of prose and poetry from German, English, and French languages into Croatian. The most important translations Gorjan penned include Herman Melville's Moby-Dick (Moby Dick ili Bijeli kit; 1953), James Joyce's Ulysses (Uliks; 1957), Olav Duun's six-part series The People of Juvik (Ljudi s Juvika; 1959) and Robert Musil's modernist novel The Man Without Qualities (Čovjek bez svojstava; 1967). Throughout the 1950s and 1960s he also translated and brought to Yugoslav audiences several works by Charles Dickens, George Eliot, D. H. Lawrence, Carson McCullers and Heinrich Böll.
