= Taha Mahmoud Taha =

Egyptian translator

- Born: 1929
- Died: 16 April 2002 (aged 72–73)
- Occupations: professor, translator

Taha Mahmoud Taha (Arabic: طه محمود طه) (1929 – April 16, 2002), an Egyptian professor and translator. One of his most famous works is the translation of Ulysses, a novel by James Joyce.

== Biography ==
Taha Mahmoud Taha was born in 1929. After high school, he attended the Faculty of Arts at Ain Shams University, where he graduated and was appointed a teaching assistant. After Taha had obtained his master's degree, he received a doctoral scholarship at Trinity College Dublin in Ireland, 1957. His PhD dissertation was about Aldous Huxley whom Taha had been sending mails since 1955. Taha returned to Cairo in February 1961 after he had obtained his PhD degree, and he joined the Faculty of Arts at Ain Shams University. However, he soon left the university in 1966 and dedicated his time to translation. He, then, returned again to academia by contracting with Kuwait University as an associate professor for modern English literature. He worked in Kuwait for 18 years. One of his achievements during that period was finishing “the Encyclopedia of James Joyce” which was issued in 1974 with the university's support. Dr. Taha worked as a teacher at King Saud University in Riyadh from 1961 to 1963.

== His interest in James Joyce’s literature ==
Taha writes in the preface of his book “the Encyclopedia of James Joyce, 1974” about the beginning of his interest in James Joyce’s literature:

“I became interested in James Joyce and his work since 1953. And the visiting professor of the Faculty of Arts at Ain Shams University, David Peter Edgell, encouraged me to read his work and reduce the severity of its opacity.”

In recognition of the professor, Taha placed his name -twenty years later- in the dedication preface of “the Encyclopedia of James Joyce”, being grateful by acknowledging: “To the one who taught me to read James Joyce: Professor David Peter Edgell.”

== Translation of Ulysses ==
Taha's translation of the first edition of James Joyce's novel Ulysses was issued in 1982. He had begun translating the novel in 1964. He published the fourth chapter in “Al-Kateb” magazine in May 1964, under the heading “45 minutes in Mr. Bloom’s life”, with an introduction and an annotation for the text. Then he published the translation of chapter 10 “The Little Maze in Ulysses” in "Al Majalla" magazine – which was headed by the editor Yahya Haqqi – in November 1965. By 1978, Taha finished translating all the chapters of the novel, only to publish the translation of the whole novel to Arabic for the first time in 1982.

Taha, about the difficulty he faced during the translation of Ulysses, says:

I would spend days facing a single word. Then when I was uncapable of finding it in the dictionaries, I came to realize that Joyce had made it up by carving off two words from two different languages, or that he used words from the colloquial spoken in the alleys of Dublin. So I had to translate the carved term by using an Arabic carved term too. And I felt as if Joyce is giving me the term and telling me defiantly: “Carve such a word if you can”. Hence from here came the difficulty of translation and the struggle with reading which essentially requires a large Arabic linguistic wealth.

Taha sought a creative translation that suits the great work of literature, combining the novel's spirit and its text. Therefore, he translated each English element with an Arabic element, and each ancient English word with the closest ancient Arabic word for it, beginning with the title of the novel “Ulysses” (عوليس).

He also tried translating each colloquial word with a colloquial equivalent, such as (Adan Al-balad) in Arabic (Eden the country) for “Edenville”. He translated each English proverb with an Arabic one, and each English song for children with an Arabic children's song. Similarly with the English colloquial poems translated to Arabic colloquial poems as much as possible, for example “I am the vagabond/wearing a vanishing cap” (literal translation of the Arabic poem written by Taha). Naturally, the colloquial Arabic that Taha used as an equivalent for the English one was the Egyptian colloquial dialect. Moreover, Taha strived for carving equivalent Arabic words for the ones that Joyce had carved in English.

He used words such as: “tama’zara” and “taqaftana”, or used his own style to give the words more of suggestibility as in “ymdaghymdagh”, “be’oyounk’hnoutiya”, and “jofounbronziya”. Years after the issuance of the translation, Dr. Taha published a dictionary specific to the novel's vocabulary. He preferred to keep the sentences written in languages other than English as they are originally, given that Joyce had used in his novel phrases of French, Latin, Italian, and some Arabic elements. Taha had been nominated for the State Merit Award for this translation in Egypt, however he did not win it. He explains “the Award Committee did not have time to read the novel, or perhaps diving into Ulysses needed competent divers who can grasp its puzzles and massive labyrinths.

Because of Taha’s efforts in transmitting Joyce’s heritage to the Arab world, he gained the membership of “James Joyce Society”. This society gathers those who are interested in Joyce's literature and are occupied with his works. It issues a quarterly magazine addressing further discoveries of his rich works. The society organizes a biennial meeting assembling its members on the 16th of June of each year (it is the day on which Joyce chose to write his events in his novel “Ulysses”, all the actions of the novel take place throughout 16 June 1904).

== His works ==
- The Story in English Literature (original title: alqisa fi al'adab al'iinjilizii): From Beowulf to Finnegans Wake (A-Ddar Al-Qawmiya for Publishing and Distribution, Cairo): done between 1962 and 1964, and it presents the history of story in English literature from Beowulf to Finnegans Wake, novels written by Joyce.
- Prominent Novelists of the 20th Century (original title: aelam alriwayat fi alqarn aleishrin), (1966): in this book he studies five of the most famous writers of the western novel. They are Edward Morgan Forster, Virginia Woolf, David Herbert Lawrence, Joseph Conrad, and Aldous Huxley.
- The Encyclopedia of James Joyce (original title: mawsueat jams joys), (1974): it took Taha seven years to collect the content and write it, he completed the book in summer 1973.

== His translations ==
- Ulysses novel by James Joyce (1982): A book of 1382 pages, in two volumes of equal size, published by the Arab Institute for Research & Publishing on the birth centenary of James Joyce. Only 500 copies of the first edition were published, then the revised second edition was published by A-Ddar Al-Arabiya in 1994.
- Finnegans Wake: the last novel by James Joyce, which was supposed to be published by A-Ddar Al-Arabiya Publisher in Cairo, but Taha died before it was published.
- Rossum's Universal Robots: a play by the Czech writer Karel Čapek.

== Death ==
Taha died on the 16th of April 2002 (corresponding to 4/2/1423H) at the age of 73.
