= Cândido de Figueiredo =

Portuguese writer, lexicographer, grammarian, and philologist

António Pereira Cândido de Figueiredo, usually referred to as Cândido de Figueiredo (Lobão da Beira, 19 September 1846 — Lisbon, 26 September 1925) was a Portuguese lawyer and civil servant by trade who later became well-known as a writer, lexicographer, grammarian, and philologist specializing in the Portuguese language.

He authored and is best known for the Novo Dicionário da Língua Portuguesa ("New Dictionary of the Portuguese Language"), first published in 1899 and then republished in twenty-five editions through 1996. Figueiredo wrote and translated into Portuguese various works regarding philology and linguistics, as well as works of fiction and social criticism. Perhaps his best known fictional book is Lisboa no ano 3000 ("Lisbon in the year 3000"), a work first published in 1892 (and recently reedited and rereleased) which critiqued Portuguese society and institutions of the era. He was a founding member of the Sociedade de Geografia de Lisboa (Lisbon Geographic Society) and a corresponding member of the Academia Brasileira de Letras (Brazilian Academy of Letters).

== Biography ==
=== Early life ===
António Pereira Cândido de Figueiredo was born on 19 September 1846 in Lobão da Beira, Tondela, Portugal. He studied theology at the Seminário de Viseu (Viseu Seminary), and was ordained a Catholic priest on 19 June 1867. He then enrolled in the Faculty of Law at the University of Coimbra, studying there between 1869 and 1874. During his studies in Coimbra, Figueiredo was active in the realist and naturalist student-led literary movement known as the Questão Coimbrã.

Figueiredo eventually abandoned the priesthood—a profession apparently forced on him by his family—obtaining a pro gratia dismissal from the clerical state from Pope Leo XIII. He started working as a lawyer. Sometime between 1874 and 1876, Figueiredo and his first wife Mariana Angélica de Andrade married.

=== Government service ===
In 1876 he settled in Lisbon, opening a law office there in partnership with fellow University of Coimbra alumnus Júlio de Vilhena, who later became a famed jurist. Although Figueiredo spent most of his time practicing law, he also served on official commissions of the Ministério do Reino ("Ministry of the Kingdom"; predecessor to the Ministry of Internal Administration) related to public education, including serving as the inspector of schools of Coimbra District. He was also involved in overseeing public registries, serving first as recorder of deeds in Pinhel, and later Fronteira and Alcácer do Sal. In Alcácer do Sal, he also served as president of the câmara municipal (municipal corporation) for a time.

In 1881 Figueiredo was nominated secretary-general of the Bull of the Crusade—a Portuguese organization administering money donated for indulgences. In 1882 he was made a provisional teacher at the Liceu Central de Lisboa, a public high school now known as the Liceu Passos Manuel. Some time later he began working as a functionary of the Ministry of Justice, where he would stay for the rest of his professional legal career. Figueiredo ultimately served the Ministry for more than 40 years, reached the rank of assistant director-general, and on multiple occasions served as the Ministry's interim director-general.

In 1887 he was elected a member of the Conselho Superior de Instrução Pública ("High Council for Public Education") as a teacher and proponent of free public education. In 1890 the Ministério do Reino nominated him to a commission in charge of reviewing Portuguese toponymy.

In 1893 Cândido de Figueiredo was appointed civil governor of Vila Real District by then Prime Minister of Portugal José Dias Ferreira. He was later a private secretary to Bernardino Machado—a future President of Portugal—when Machado was Minister of Public Works, Commerce and Industry.

=== Career as a writer ===
Outside of his professional activities, Cândido de Figueiredo became a well-known writer and poet. His work was published in various Portuguese periodicals of his time, including O Panorama, Aljubarrota, Lusitano, Progresso, Bem Público, Voz Feminina, Revista dos Monumentos Sepulcrais, Almanaque de Lembranças, Notícias (which would later become Diário Popular), Grinalda, Crisálida, País, Hinos e Flores, Repositório Literário, Tribuno Popular, Independência, Recreio Literário, Folha, Panorama Fotográfico, Viriato, Gazeta Setubalense, Democracia (published in Elvas). He founded the periodical A Capital and edited the newspaper Globo. He also contributed stories and collaborated with various magazines, including Revista de Portugal e Brasil, Ocidente, República das Letras (1875), Ribaltas e Gambiarras (1881), A Arte Musical (1898-1915), O Branco e Negro (1899), Serões (1901-1911), Atlântida (1915-1920), and even in the humorous publication A Paródia (1900-1907) under the pseudonym "O Caturra". For many years he also wrote fictional serials for the Portuguese newspaper Diário de Notícias under the pseudonym "Cedef".

As a lexicographer and philologist, Figueiredo served on a 1911 commission which set what was at the time the standard orthography of the Portuguese language. Other well-known Portuguese lexicographers and philologists who served alongside him on that commission included Carolina Michaëlis de Vasconcelos, Aniceto dos Reis Gonçalves Viana, José Leite de Vasconcelos, Francisco Adolfo Coelho, Manuel Borges Grainha, António José Gonçalves Guimarães, Júlio Moreira, José Joaquim Nunes, and António Garcia Ribeiro de Vasconcelos.

Cândido de Figueiredo died on 26 September 1925 in Lisbon.

== Awards and honors ==
Figueiredo was a member or associate of various honorary academies. In 1871 he was made a member of the Instituto de Coimbra (Coimbra Institute). In 1874 he was elected a corresponding member of the Lisbon Academy of Sciences, and made a full member in 1915. When Figueiredo died, he was president of the Lisbon Academy of Sciences. In 1876—along with Luciano Cordeiro—Figueiredo founded the Sociedade de Geografia de Lisboa (Lisbon Geographic Society). He was also a corresponding member of the Academia Brasileira de Letras (Brazilian Academy of Letters). In 1902 he was elected to the Royal Spanish Academy.
