= Portuguese Orthographic Reform of 1911 =

Initiative to standardise and simplify the writing of Portuguese

The Orthographic Reform of 1911 was an initiative to standardize and simplify the writing of the Portuguese language in Portugal in 1911.

Having the force of law in Portugal and having been made due to the establishment of the republic in an attempt to distance the monarchy from the people, this reform completely changed the appearance of the written language and indirectly led to all subsequent orthographic reforms/agreements.

== History ==
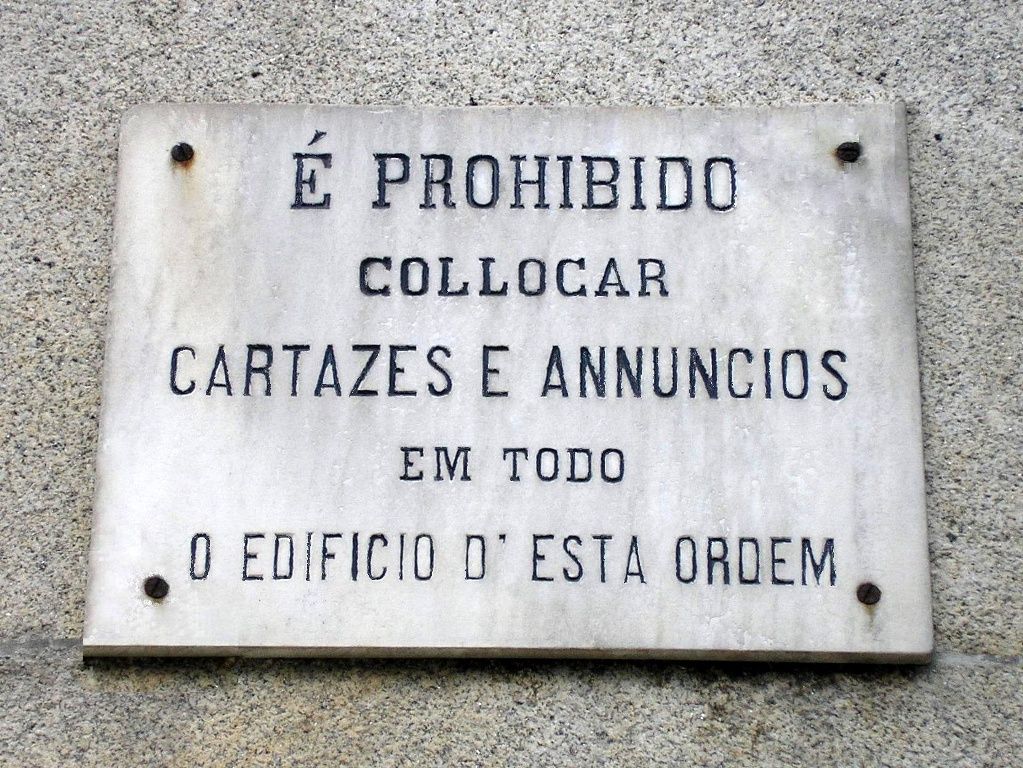
É prohibido collocar cartazes e annuncios em todo o edificio d'esta ordem, a notice prior to the 1911 Orthographic Reform, on the wall of the Igreja do Carmo, in Porto

Until the beginning of the 20th century, Portuguese followed an orthography which, as a rule, was based on the etymology from Latin or classical Greek, and some examples of words that changed are:

- phosphoro -> fósforo
- orthographia -> ortografia
- phleugma -> fleuma
- exhausto -> exausto
- estylo -> estilo
- prompto -> pronto
- diphthongo -> ditongo
- psalmo -> salmo

Over the years, various language scholars presented successive proposals to simplify writing, without much success. Among these proposals were the Bases da Ortografia Portuguesa, from 1885, by Aniceto dos Reis Gonçalves Viana and Guilherme de Vasconcelos Abreu.

Soon after the establishment of the republic in Portugal, on 5 October 1910, the new government, committed to extending schooling and combating illiteracy, named a commission - made up of Gonçalves Viana, Carolina Michaëlis, Cândido de Figueiredo, Adolfo Coelho, Leite de Vasconcelos, Gonçalves Guimarães, Ribeiro de Vasconcelos, Júlio Gonçalves Moreira, José Joaquim Nunes, Borges Grainha and Augusto Epifânio da Silva Dias (who asked to be excused) - to establish a simplified orthography to be used in official publications and teaching. The foundations of the Orthographic Reform, very much inspired by the proposals of 1885, were made official by decree on 1 September 1911, allowing for a transition period of three years. The reform was also approved by the Portuguese authorities.

Although there had been a strong phoneticist movement in Brazil for a long time, fighting for orthographic simplification, Brazil's non-involvement in the Portuguese reform had the opposite effect of strengthening the traditionalist currents, leaving the two countries with different orthographies: Portugal with a reformed orthography, Brazil maintaining its etymologically-based orthography.

After the failed attempt to establish an inter-academic orthographic agreement in 1911, it was after the bases of the reform were modified on 29 November 1920 by the surviving members of the 1911 commission, that the Lisbon Academy of Sciences and the Brazilian Academy of Letters stepped up their efforts to find the basis for a common orthography from 1924 onwards, The first Luso-Brazilian Orthographic Agreement was signed on 30 April 1931, which practically adopted the Portuguese orthography of 1911, beginning a long process of convergence between the orthographies of the two countries that has lasted to this day.

== Main changes ==
This reform of Portuguese orthography - the first official reform in Portugal since the one that led to the emergence of an autonomous Portuguese script at the dawn of the 13th century - was profound and changed the appearance of the written language. - was far-reaching and completely changed the appearance of the written language.

The main changes introduced were:

1. Delete all digraphs of Greek origin and replace them with simple graphemes: th (replaced by t), ph (replaced by f), ch (with a value of [k], replaced by c or qu depending on the context) and rh (replaced by r or rr depending on the context);
2. Deletion of y (replaced by i);
3. Reduction of doubled (or geminated) consonants to singles, with the exception of medial rr and ss of Latin origin, which have specific values in Portuguese;
4. Elimination of some "silent consonants" at the end of graphic syllables, when they didn't influence the pronunciation of the vowel that preceded them;
5. Introduction of numerous graphic accents, particularly in proparoxytones.

== Challenges to the reform ==
The adoption of this new orthography was not without resistance in Portugal, but the biggest controversy erupted in Brazil. Some linguists defended etymological spelling to the detriment of the purely phonetic spelling of words, claiming that the spelling reform severed the link between the practitioners of the Portuguese language and the writings left by their ancestors. Other people resisted the change, either for fear of not being able to write according to the new rules, or because of an emotional or intellectual attachment to the graphic memory of writing. This feeling is reflected in this extract by Alexandre Fontes, written on the eve of the spelling reform of 1911:

Imagine the word "phase", written like this: "fase". It doesn't look like a word to us, it looks like a skeleton (...) We get extraordinarily upset when we think that we'd have to write it like that!

— Alexandre Fontes,

Teixeira de Pascoaes also expressed his opinion:

In the word lagryma, (...) the shape of the y is lacrymal; it establishes (...) the harmony between its graphic or plastic expression and its psychological expression; to replace the y with the i is to offend the rules of aesthetics. In the word "abyss", it is the shape of the "y" that gives it depth, darkness, mystery... To write it with the Latin "i" is to close the mouth of the abyss, to turn it into a banal surface.

— Teixeira de Pascoaes,

And so did Fernando Pessoa:

I don't have any political or social feelings. I do, however, have, in one sense, a high patriotic feeling. My homeland is the Portuguese language. I wouldn't mind if they invaded or took over Portugal, as long as they didn't bother me personally. But I hate, with true hatred, with the only hatred I feel, not anyone who writes Portuguese badly, not anyone who doesn't know syntax, not anyone who writes in simplified orthography, but the badly written page, as a person, the wrong syntax, as a person to be beaten, orthography without ipsilon, as direct spit that disgusts me no matter who spits it out.

— Fernando Pessoa,

== See also ==
- Portuguese orthography
- Reforms of Portuguese orthography
- Portuguese Language Orthographic Agreement of 1990
- 1943 Portuguese Orthographic Form
