= Besteiros =

Besteiros may refer to:

- Besteiros Parish, Amares
- Besteiros Parish, Paredes
- Besteiros, Portugal - former city now part of Tondela:
  - Barreiro de Besteiros
  - Campo de Besteiros
  - Santiago de Besteiros
  - Vilar de Besteiros
