= Tomás Ribeiro =

Tomás Ribeiro may refer to:

- Tomás Ribeiro (writer)
- Tomás Ribeiro (footballer)
