= António Ribeiro =

António or Antônio Ribeiro may refer to:

- António Ribeiro Chiado (1520–1591), Portuguese poet
- António Nunes Ribeiro Sanches (1699–1783), Portuguese physician and philosopher
- Antônio Carlos Ribeiro de Andrada (1773–1845), Brazilian judge and politician
- Antônio João Ribeiro (1823–1864), Brazilian army officer
- António Cândido (politician) (António Cândido Ribeiro da Costa, 1850–1922), Portuguese politician
- António Garcia Ribeiro de Vasconcelos (1860–1941), Portuguese historian and theologian
- Ribeiro dos Reis (António Ribeiro dos Reis, 1896–1961), Portuguese footballer and journalist
- Antônio Ribeiro de Oliveira (1926–2017), Brazilian bishop
- António Ribeiro (cardinal) (1928–1998), Portuguese cardinal
- António Oliveira (footballer, born 1952) (António Luís Alves Ribeiro de Oliveira, born 1952), Portuguese footballer
- António da Silva Ribeiro (born 1957), Portuguese admiral
- Badalhoca (Antônio Carlos Gueiros Ribeiro, born 1957), Brazilian volleyball player
- António Ribeiro (soccer, born 1980), Portuguese-Canadian soccer player
- António Ribeiro (footballer, born 2004), Portuguese footballer

== See also ==
- Antonio Riberi (1897–1967), Monegasque cardinal
- Anthony Ribera (born 1945), American police officer
