= Lobão da Beira =

- Civil parish
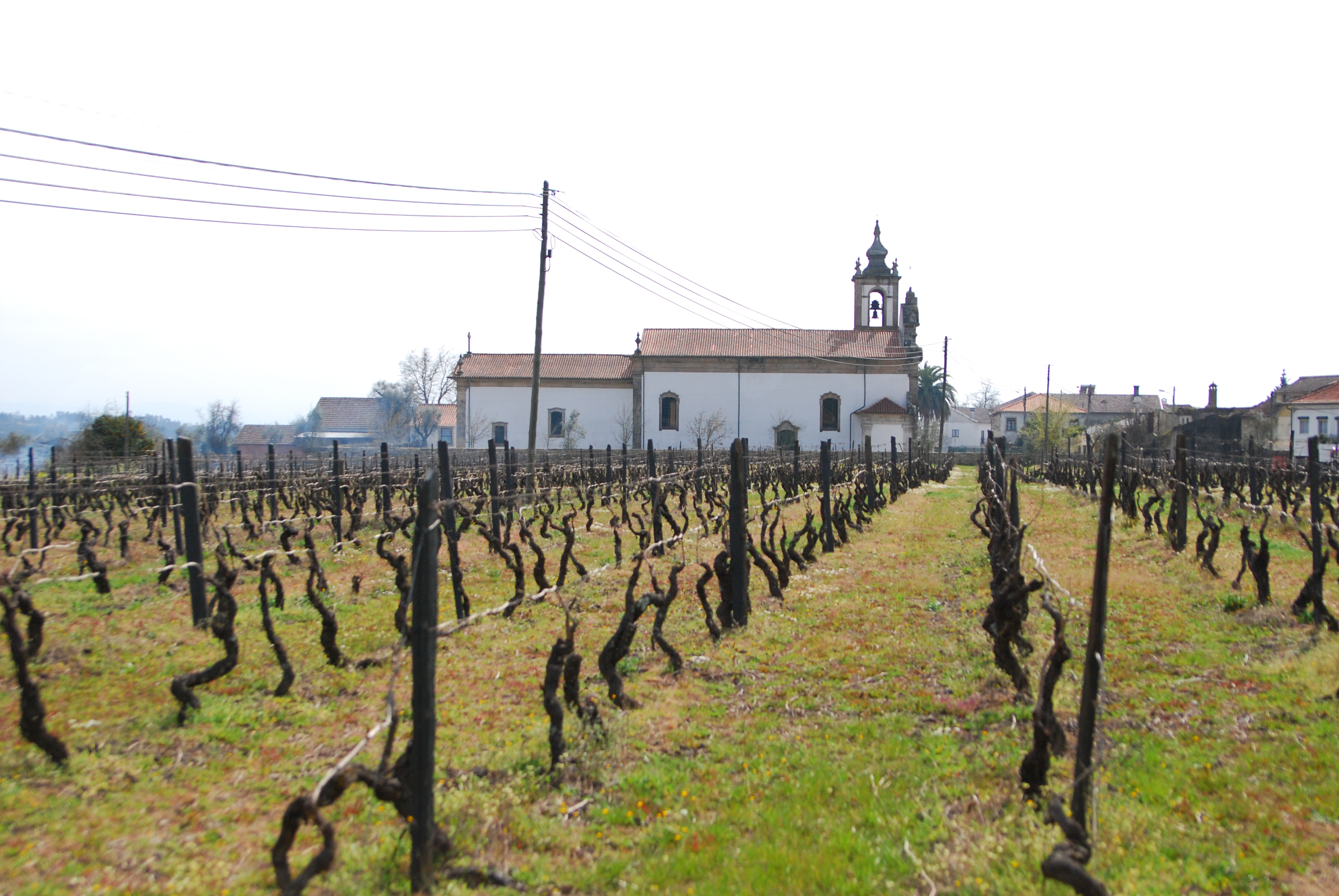
- Church of Lobão da Beira (Igreja de Lobão da Beira)

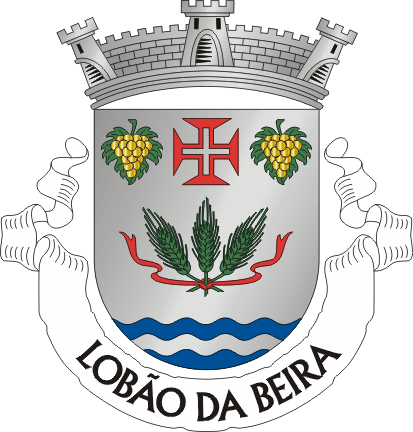
- Coat of arms

- Location in Portugal
- Coordinates: 40.3149°N 8.0145°W
- Country: Portugal
- Region: Centro
- Intermunic. comm.: Viseu Dão Lafões
- District: Viseu
- Municipality: Tondela

Area
  - Total: 14.11 km^{2} (5.45 sq mi)

Population (2011)
  - Total: 1,124
  - Density: 79.66/km^{2} (206.3/sq mi)
- Time zone: UTC+00:00 (WET)
  - Summer (DST): UTC+01:00 (WEST)
- Postal code: 3460-205

Lobão da Beira is a civil parish (freguesia) in the municipality of Tondela, Portugal. The population was 1,124 in 2011, in an area of 14.11 square kilometres (5.45 sq mi), resulting in a population density of 79.65 people per square kilometre (206.3 people/mi^{2}).

Portuguese writer Cândido de Figueiredo was born in Lobão da Beira.

== Demographics ==
Historical population

Year	Pop.	±%
1864	1,735	—
1878	1,803	+3.9%
1890	1,734	−3.8%
1900	1,718	−0.9%
1911	1,834	+6.8%
1920	1,500	−18.2%
1930	1,686	+12.4%
1940	1,660	−1.5%

Year	Pop.	±%
1950	1,630	−1.8%
1960	1,605	−1.5%
1970	1,463	−8.8%
1981	1,424	−2.7%
1991	1,264	−11.2%
2001	1,207	−4.5%
2011	1,124	−6.9%
