= Reforms of Portuguese orthography =

Spelling reform

The Portuguese language began to be used regularly in documents and poetry around the 12th century. Unlike neighboring Romance languages that adopted formal orthographies by the 18th century, the Portuguese language did not have a uniform spelling standard until the 20th century. The formation of the First Portuguese Republic in 1911 was motivation for the establishment of a committee led by Aniceto dos Reis Gonçalves Viana to initiate orthographic reform in Portugal and its overseas territories and colonies. Brazil would adopt an orthographic standard based on, but not identical to, the Portuguese standard a few decades later.

Further minor spelling reforms were approved in lusophone countries over the rest of the 20th century. In 1990, a further agreement was reached between the various countries, with Portugal, Brazil, and Cape Verde adopting the new standard gradually by the beginning of 2016.

== Pre-modern Portuguese orthography ==
The Portuguese language began to be used regularly in documents and poetry around the 12th century. In 1290, King Denis created the first Portuguese university in Lisbon (later moved to Coimbra) and decreed that Portuguese, then called simply the "common language", would henceforth be used instead of Latin, and named the "Portuguese language". In 1296, it was adopted by the royal chancellery and began to be used for writing laws and in notaries.

The medieval spelling of Portuguese was not uniform, since it had no official standard, but most authors used an essentially phonemic orthography, with minor concessions to etymology common in other Romance languages, such as the use of c for /ts/ before e or i, but ç otherwise, or the use of ss for /s/ between vowels, but s otherwise. King Denis, who was an admirer of the poetry of the troubadours and a poet himself, popularized the Occitan digraphs nh and lh for the palatal consonants /ɲ/ and /ʎ/, which until then had been spelled with several digraphs, including nn and ll, as in Spanish. These early forms of Old Portuguese spelling in transition have been referred to as Latin–Portuguese or Latin-Romance.

During the Renaissance, appreciation for classical culture led many authors to imitate Latin and (Romanized) Ancient Greek, filling words with a profusion of silent letters and other etymological graphemes, such as ch (pronounced as c/qu), ph (pronounced as f), rh, th, y (pronounced as i), cc, pp, tt, mn (pronounced as n), sce, sci (pronounced as ce, ci), bt, pt, mpt (pronounced as t), and so on, still found today in the orthographies of French and English.

Contrary to neighboring languages such as Spanish or French, whose orthographies were set by language academies in the 17th century (French) and the 18th century (Spanish), Portuguese had no official spelling until the early 20th century; authors wrote as they pleased with substantial difference in spelling or other elements.

== Orthographic standardization ==
In 1911, the newly formed Portuguese Republic, concerned with improving the literacy of its citizens, charged a commission of philologists with defining a standard orthography for Portuguese. The result was what has come to be known in Portugal as the orthographic reform of Gonçalves Viana. The new standard became official in Portugal and its overseas territories at the time, which are today the independent nations of Angola, Cape Verde, Guinea-Bissau, Mozambique, São Tomé and Príncipe, and East Timor, as well as the Chinese S.A.R. of Macau (Note: The official spelling of the Portuguese language in Macau is currently fixed by Decree-Law No. 103/99/M) and the Indian state of Goa and territories of Daman and Diu, and Dadra and Nagar Haveli. In 1938, Brazil set up an orthography of its own, with the same general principles as the Portuguese orthography, but not entirely identical to it.

=== Basic principles ===
The authors of the first spelling reform of Portuguese, imbued with the modern ideas of phonology, rejected the etymological spellings current in the previous centuries, preferring a more phonetic orthography, like those of Spanish and Italian. On the other hand, considering that the period of Galician-Portuguese troubadorian poetry had been a golden age of Portuguese literature, they aimed to keep the new orthography as close to the medieval spelling as possible, in spite of some phonetic changes which the language had undergone. The resulting orthographic standard was essentially a compromise between these intents, on one hand, and common traditions, on the other: in a few cases, spelling conventions which went against etymology but had long become customary were made official.

Thus, the reform kept some graphemic distinctions for phonological traits which were not present in every dialect, but still present in at least some areas: between z and intervocalic s (/dz/ and /z/ in medieval Portuguese, but now reduced to /z/ in most dialects), between c/ç and s(s) (/ts/ and /s/ in medieval Portuguese, but now reduced to /s/ in most dialects), and between ch and x (originally /tʃ/ and /ʃ/, now just /ʃ/ in most dialects, although the distinction is still retained in some). The unstressed vowels e and o were also retained for word-family homogeneity and etymology when they were pronounced as i or u, respectively, and the digraph ou was differentiated from o, even though many speakers now pronounced both as /o/. These distinctions have close parallels in the orthographies of other West European languages.

Since word stress can be distinctive in Portuguese, the acute accent was used to mark the stressed vowel whenever it was not in the usual position, more or less as in the orthographies of Spanish and Catalan. For example, the verb critica "he criticizes" bears no accent mark, because it is stressed on the syllable before the last one, like most words that end in -a, but the noun crítica "criticism" requires an accent mark, since it is a proparoxytone.

Since the height of the vowels a, e and o is also distinctive in stressed syllables (see Portuguese phonology), high stressed vowels were marked with a circumflex accent, â, ê, ô, to be differentiated from the low stressed vowels, written á, é, ó. The choice of the acute for low vowels and the circumflex for high vowels went against the conventions of other Romance languages such as French or Italian, but it was already commonplace in Portuguese before the 20th century. (In many words, Portuguese ê and ô correspond to the Latin long vowels ē, ō.)

Nasal vowels and nasal diphthongs usually appear before the orthographic nasal consonants n, m, in which case they do not need to be identified with diacritics, but the tilde was placed on nasal a and nasal o when they occurred before another letter, or at the end of a word. Although the vowel u can also be nasal before other vowels, this happens in so few words (mui, muito, muita, muitos, muitas) that marking its nasality was not considered necessary.

The acute accent was used also to mark the second vowel of a hiatus in a stressed syllable, where a diphthong would normally be expected, distinguishing for example conclui "he concludes" from concluí "I concluded", saia "that he leave" from saía "he used to leave", or fluido "fluid" from fluído "flowed".

Initially, the orthographic system, both in Brazil and Portugal, determined the usage of diacritics in cases where two words would otherwise be homographic but not homophonous, such as acôrdo, "agreement", distinguishing it from acordo, "I wake up". This principle was abandoned in all but a dozen cases in 1945 in Portugal and in 1973 in Brazil. (In most cases the homographs were different parts of speech, meaning that context was enough to distinguish them.)

The orthography set by the 1911 reform is essentially the one still in use today on both sides of the Atlantic, with only minor adjustments having been made to the vowels, consonants, and digraphs. Since then, the only remaining significant differences between the two standards, and only substantial changes addressed in the 1990 spelling reform, were in the use of diacritics and silent consonants.

== Brazilian orthography vs. Portuguese orthography ==
Brazil was never consulted about the orthographic reform of 1911, and so it did not adopt it. In the decades that followed, negotiations were held between representatives of Brazil and Portugal, with the intent of agreeing on a uniform orthography for Portuguese, but progress was slow. In 1931, Portugal and Brazil finally signed an orthographic agreement, on the basis of which Brazil established its own official orthography, in 1943.

Soon after, however, it became apparent that there were differences between the spellings being used in the two countries. Even though both were based on the same general principles, phonetic differences between European Portuguese and Brazilian Portuguese had led to divergent spellings in some cases. Various attempts were made in the remainder of the 20th century to bring the two orthographies closer to each other, sometimes with modest success, other times without success. To this day, they do not coincide completely.

=== Problems with the original orthography ===
Notwithstanding its traces of etymology, the 1911 orthography aimed to be phonetic in the sense that, given the spelling of a word, there would be no ambiguity about its pronunciation. For that reason, it had certain characteristics which later produced inconsistencies between the European and the Brazilian orthographies.

In unstressed syllables, hiatuses were originally distinguished from diphthongs with a trema. For instance, writing saüdade, traïdor, constituïção, so that they would be pronounced sa-udade, tra-idor, constitu-ição. But the pronunciation of these words is not uniform. Many speakers say sau-dade and trai-dor, especially in fast speech. Furthermore, there are no minimal pairs that distinguish a hiatus from a falling diphthong in unstressed syllables. For this reason, marking unstressed hiatuses came to be seen as unnecessary, and these tremas were eventually abolished.

The trema was also used in the words where the letter u is, exceptionally, pronounced in the digraphs gue, gui, que, qui, rather than silent as usual; e.g. agüentar, sagüim, freqüente, eqüidade. However, there is regional variation, with for example the u being pronounced in a few Brazilian Portuguese accents qüestão, but not in European Portuguese questão. Although the number of words with such divergent pronunciations is small, they have been seen as an obstacle to the orthographic unification of the language.

Unstressed vowels are usually high, but there are exceptions, including a few pairs of homographs in European Portuguese which vary only in having either a low or a high vowel in an unstressed syllable. To distinguish these, the grave accent was at first placed on unstressed low vowels: cf. pregar "to nail", where the e is pronounced /ɨ/ in European Portuguese, with prègar "to preach", where è is pronounced /ɛ/, or molhada /u/ "wet" with mòlhada /ɔ/ "bundle". But in Brazilian Portuguese both words in each example are pronounced the same way, so the grave accent is not used: pregar /e/ "to nail/to preach", molhada /o/ "wet/bundle"; the intended meaning is inferred from context. The grave accent was eventually abolished, except in a small number of contractions.

In other cases, where an unstressed low vowel was the result of the elision of the consonants c or p before c, ç, t, the consonant was kept in the spelling, to denote the quality of the preceding vowel. For example, in the word intercepção, which is stressed on its last syllable, the letter p is not pronounced, but indicates that the second e is pronounced /ɛ/, as opposed to the second e in intercessão, which is pronounced /ɨ/. Other examples of words where a silent consonant was left to lower the previous vowel are objecção and factor. In Brazilian Portuguese, the vowels in question are pronounced just like any other unstressed vowels, and, since there is no phonetic ambiguity to undo, the words are simply spelled objeção, fator, and so on.

The orthography distinguished between stressed éi and stressed ei. In Brazilian Portuguese, these diphthongs are indeed different, but in most dialects of European Portuguese both are pronounced the same way, and éi appears only by convention in some oxytone plural nouns and adjectives. This led to divergent spellings such as idéia (Brazil) and ideia (Portugal).

Due to differing pronunciations, Brazilian spelling has a, ê or ô in several words where the European orthography has, respectively, á, é or ó. For example, compare pensamos, gênero, tônico (Brazil) with pensámos, género, tónico (Portugal). This happens because — when the aforementioned vowels are stressed before the nasal consonants m or n and followed by another vowel —, European Portuguese includes either the high or low vowel forms, while Brazilian Portuguese only uses low vowels in such positions.

== Timeline of spelling reforms ==
- 1911: First spelling reform in Portugal.
- 1931: Orthographic agreement between Portugal and Brazil. The agreement did not come into force, but some of its proposals (such as abolition of silent s from words such as sciência, scena, scéptico, etc., and change from dir-se há and amar-te hei to dir-se-á and amar-te-ei) were accepted by later reforms.
- 1943: First orthographic reform of Brazil is delineated in the Vocabulário Ortográfico da Língua Portuguesa, by the Academia Brasileira de Letras.
- 1945: Sweeping spelling reform in Portugal eliminates the trema, and differential circumflex accents in most pairs of homographs such as acêrto and acerto, cêrca and cerca, côr and cor, fôra and fora, dêsse and desse, and so on. The orthographic rules of 1945 were written as an orthographic agreement between Portugal and Brazil, but Brazil did not adopt them.
- 1971: Sweeping spelling reform in Brazil eliminates the trema in hiatuses, most differential circumflexes, and accent marks on vowels with secondary stressed syllables in compounds, such as ràpidamente, ùltimamente, cortêsmente, cafèzinho, and so on.
- 1973: Portugal follows Brazil in abolishing accent marks in secondary stressed syllables.
- 1986: Brazil invites the other six Portuguese language countries, Angola, Cape Verde, Guinea-Bissau, Mozambique, Portugal and São Tomé and Príncipe, to a meeting in Rio de Janeiro to address the remaining problems. A radical reform which would eliminate the acute accent and the circumflex accent from all words except oxytones (as in the orthography of Italian) is proposed but abandoned after a negative reaction from both the Brazilian and Portuguese media and public.
- 1990: A new orthographic agreement is reached between Brazil, Portugal and the other Portuguese-speaking countries. Not so radical as the 1986 attempt, it proposes a compromise between the two orthographic systems.
- 2009: The new 1990 spelling reform goes into effect in Brazil, in Portugal, and in Cabo Verde, changing the rules of capitalization and hyphen usage, eliminating the trema completely from the language (except for foreign words), changing the diphthongs "éi" and "ói" into "ei" and "oi" respectively in paroxytones, and eliminating silent letters as in acção or óptimo, which are now spelled ação and ótimo.
- 2015–2016: The transitional period in Portugal, Cabo Verde, and Brazil, during which both orthographies co-existed, ends. Only the new orthography is official from May 2015 (Portugal), October 2015 (Cabo Verde), and January 2016 (Brazil).

== Orthographic Agreement of 1990 ==
In 1990, an orthographic agreement was reached between the Portuguese-language countries with the intent of creating a single common orthography for Portuguese.

This spelling reform went into effect in Brazil on 1 January 2009. In Portugal, the reform was signed into law by the President on 21 July 2008, allowing for a six-year adaptation period, during which both orthographies co-existed.

The legality of this decision is questioned, as the main bases of the International Treaty that governs the application of the new spelling reform are yet to be established, chiefly the common vocabulary drawn by all participating countries, that still does not exist. Also, the application of International Treaties, as per the Vienna Convention, states that the text of a treaty cannot be changed, and this one has undergone at least two revisions.

== See also ==
- Portuguese orthography
- Portuguese Orthographic Reform of 1911
- 1943 Portuguese Orthographic Form
- Portuguese Language Orthographic Agreement of 1990
- Academia Brasileira de Letras
