= Portuguese-Language Orthographic Agreement of 1990 =

International treaty

The Portuguese-Language Orthographic Agreement of 1990 (Portuguese: Acordo Ortográfico da Língua Portuguesa de 1990) is an international treaty whose purpose is to create a unified orthography for the Portuguese language, to be used by all the countries that have Portuguese as their official language. It was signed in Lisbon, on 16 December 1990, at the end of a negotiation, begun in 1980, between the Sciences Academy of Lisbon and the Brazilian Academy of Letters. The signatories included official representatives from all of the Portuguese-language countries except East Timor, which was under Indonesian occupation at the time, but later adhered to the Agreement, in 2004, and Equatorial Guinea, which adopted Portuguese as an official language only in 2010.

Galicia was invited to take part in the reform but the Spanish government ignored the invitation, since it officially regards Galician and Portuguese as different languages. However, an unofficial commission formed by Galician linguists who support the unity of the language attended the meetings as observers.

As of 2023, the agreement has been ratified and implemented by the Portuguese-speaking countries Portugal, Brazil and Cape Verde. Countries like Angola and Mozambique still use the old orthography and have not completed the adoption of the reform. The former Portuguese colony of Macau is not a party to the agreement and retains the old orthography. The agreement's objectives of unifying the orthography in all CPLP countries and compiling a common vocabulary for the entire Portuguese language have not been fully achieved and failed.

As of the decade of 2020, the agreement does not have complete adoption from the Portuguese-speaking countries, still without reaching its objectives of unification of the orthography and compilation of a vocabulary common to the Lusophony.

== Intentions ==
The Orthographic Agreement of 1990 intended to establish a single official orthography for the Portuguese language and thus to improve its international status, putting an end to the existence of two official orthographic norms: one in Brazil and another in the remaining Portuguese-speaking countries. Proposers of the Agreement gave the Spanish language as a motivating example: Spanish has multiple variations, between Spain and Hispanic America, both in pronunciation and in vocabulary, but it is under the same spelling norm, regulated by the Association of Spanish Language Academies.

The contents and the legal value of the treaty have not achieved a consensus among linguists, philologists, scholars, journalists, writers, translators and figures of the arts, politics and business of the Brazilian and Portuguese societies. Therefore, its application has been the object of disagreements for linguistic, political, economic and legal reasons. There are even some who claim the unconstitutionality of the treaty. Some others claim that the Orthographic Agreement chiefly serves the geopolitical and economic interests of Brazil.

== Precedents ==
Until the beginning of the 20th century, in Portugal as in Brazil, an orthography was used that, by rule, relied on Greek or Latin etymology to form words, e.g. pharmacia ("pharmacy"), lyrio ("lily"), and diccionario ("dictionary"), among others.

In 1911, following the establishment of the Portuguese republic, a wide orthographic reform was adopted – the Orthographic Reform of 1911 – which completely modified the face of the written language, bringing it closer to contemporary pronunciation. However, this reform was made without any agreement with Brazil, leaving both countries with two entirely different orthographies: Portugal with its reformed orthography, Brazil with its traditional orthography (called pseudo-etimológica, "pseudo-etymological").

As time passed, the Science Academy of Lisbon and the Brazilian Academy of Letters led successive attempts to establish a common spelling between both countries. In 1931, the first agreement was reached; however, as vocabularies published in 1940 (in Portugal) and in 1943 (in Brazil) continued to contain some divergences, a new meeting was held that created the Orthographic Agreement of 1945. This agreement became law in Portugal, by Decree 35.288/45. In Brazil, the Agreement of 1945 was approved by Decree-Law 8.286/45, but it was never ratified by the National Congress and was repealed by Law 2.623/55, leaving Brazilians with the rules of the 1943 agreement.

A new agreement between Portugal and Brazil – effective in 1971 in Brazil and in 1973 in Portugal – brought the orthographies slightly closer, removing the written accents responsible for 70% of the divergences between the two official systems and those that marked the unstressed syllable in words derived with the suffix -mente or beginning with -z-, e.g. sòmente (somente, "only"), sòzinho (sozinho, "alone"). Other attempts failed in 1975 – in part due to the period of political upheaval in Portugal, the Revolutionary Process in Progress (PREC) – and in 1986 – due to the reaction elicited in both countries by the suppression of written accents in paroxytone words.

However, according to proponents of reform, the fact that the persistence of two orthographies in the Portuguese language – the Luso-African and the Brazilian – impedes the trans-Atlantic unity of Portuguese and diminishes its prestige in the world – was expressed by the "Preliminary Basis for Unified Portuguese Orthography" in 1988, addressing criticisms directed toward at the proposal of 1986 and leading to the Orthographic Agreement of 1990.

== History of the process ==
=== Participants ===
For the development of the agreement, from 6 to 12 October 1990, the following delegations met at the Science Academy of Lisbon:

- Angola: Filipe Zau
- Brazil: Antônio Houaiss and Nélida Piñon
- Cape Verde: Gabriel Moacyr Rodrigues and Manuel Veiga
- Galicia (observers): António Gil Hernández and José Luís Fontenla
- Guinea-Bissau: António Soares Lopes Júnior and João Wilson Barbosa
- Mozambique: João Pontífice and Maria Eugénia Cruz
- Portugal: Américo da Costa Ramalho, Aníbal Pinto de Castro, Fernando Cristóvão, Fernando Roldão Dias Agudo, João Malaca Casteleiro, José Tiago de Oliveira, Luís Lindley Cintra, Manuel Jacinto Nunes, Maria Helena da Rocha Pereira, Leonel Gonçalves, and Vasconcelos Marques
- São Tomé and Príncipe: Albertino dos Santos Bragança and João Hermínio Pontífice

In addition to these, in the Preliminary Basis for Unified Portuguese Orthography of 1988, and in the Convention of the Orthographic Unification of Portuguese, formed in the Brazilian Academy of Letters in Rio de Janeiro from 6 to 12 May 1986, the following were also present: Maria Luísa Dolbeth e Costa (Angola); Abgar Renault, Adriano da Gama Kury, Austregésilo de Athayde, Celso Cunha, Eduardo Portella, Francisco de Assis Balthar Peixoto de Vasconcellos and José Olympio Rache de Almeida (Brazil); Corsino Fortes (Cape Verde); Paulo Pereira (Guinea-Bissau); Luís Filipe Pereira (Mozambique); Maria de Lourdes Belchior Pontes and Mário Quarin Graça (Portugal).

=== Agreement and amendment protocols ===
In Article III, the Orthographic Agreement of 1990 scheduled its taking effect for 1 January 1994, following the ratification of all members. However, as only Portugal (on 23 August 1991), Brazil (on 18 April 1995), and Cape Verde have ratified the document, its complete implementation is pending.

On 17 July 1998, in Praia, Cape Verde, an "Amending Protocol for the Portuguese Language Orthographic Agreement" was signed that retracted the deadline from the original text, although it remained necessary for all signatories to ratify the agreement before it took effect. Once again, only the dignitaries of Brazil, Portugal, and Cape Verde approved this protocol.

In June 2004, the heads of state and government of the Community of Portuguese Language Countries (CPLP), gathered in São Tomé and Príncipe, approved a "Second Amending Protocol for the Orthographic Agreement" that, apart from permitting the addition of East Timor, provided that, instead of ratification by all countries, ratification by three members would suffice for it to take effect.

Vasco Graça Moura, writer and former member of the European Parliament, the best-known of the agreement's detractors, maintains that the Second Amending Protocol, like any other international convention, only obligates its implementation in each country if it is ratified by all signatories, something that has not yet occurred. In other words, only after all countries ratify the treaty are they obligated to implement the changes domestically after ratification by three members. The rationality of a legal treaty that obliges a country to adopt another treaty if approved by third countries is disputed. This argument of the 2004 ratification's purported illegality was questioned by lawyer and European Parliament member Vital Moreira.

Brazil ratified the Second Amending Protocol in October 2004, as did Cape Verde in April 2005. On 17 November 2006, São Tomé and Príncipe ratified the treaty and its amending protocols, fulfilling the provisions of this protocol.

Angola has not yet signed the agreement and has asked other PALOP countries to support it in discussions on various points of that accord with Portugal.

== Changes ==
The adoption of the new orthography will cause changes in the spelling of about 1.6% of the words in the European norm (official also in Africa, Asia and Oceania) and about 0.5% in the Brazilian norm. The table below illustrates typical differences between the two orthographies currently in use.

According to the vocabulary developed in 2008 by the Institute of Theoretical and Computational Linguistics (Lisbon) from the database language MorDebe with 135,000 words, the percentage of words affected (simple words that are not inflected entries in dictionary or vocabulary) amounts to nearly 4% in the European standard. However, this figure includes both words that have changes in spelling, such as variants that are to be legally valid across CPLP.

The 1990 orthographic agreement proposes the elimination of the letters c and p from the European/African spelling whenever they are silent, the elimination of the diaeresis mark (ü) from the Brazilian spelling, and the elimination of the acute accent from the diphthongs éi and ói in paroxytone words. As for divergent spellings such as anónimo and anônimo, facto and fato, both will be considered legitimate, according to the dialect of the author or person being transcribed. The agreement also establishes some common guidelines for the use of hyphens and capitalization, the former still to be developed and fixed in a common vocabulary.

It will also add three letters (K, W, and Y) to the Portuguese alphabet, making it equal to the ISO basic Latin alphabet.

Comparison between the two orthographies currently in use and the former Brazilian orthography
Former European orthography	Former Brazilian orthography	New orthography (1990 Agreement)
De facto, o português é actualmente a terceira língua Europeia mais falada do mundo.	De fato, o português é atualmente a terceira língua européia mais falada do mundo.	De fa(c)to, o português é atualmente a terceira língua europeia mais falada do mundo.
Não é preciso ser génio para saber que o aspecto económico pesa muito na projecção internacional de qualquer língua.	Não é preciso ser gênio para saber que o aspecto econômico pesa muito na projeção internacional de qualquer língua.	Não é preciso ser génio/gênio para saber que o aspe(c)to económico/econômico pesa muito na projeção internacional de qualquer língua.
Não há nada melhor do que sair sem direcção, rumando para Norte ou para Sul, para passar um fim-de-semana tranquilo em pleno Agosto.	Não há nada melhor do que sair sem direção, rumando para norte ou para sul, para passar um fim-de-semana tranqüilo em pleno agosto.	Não há nada melhor do que sair sem direção, rumando para norte ou para sul, para passar um fim de semana tranquilo em pleno agosto.
Dizem que é uma sensação incrível saltar de pára-quedas pela primeira vez em pleno voo.	Dizem que é uma sensação incrível saltar de pára-quedas pela primeira vez em pleno vôo.	Dizem que é uma sensação incrível saltar de paraquedas pela primeira vez em pleno voo.

Written varieties
Area	Before 1990		Agreement	Translation
Area	Euro-African	Brazilian	Agreement	Translation
Different pronunciation	anónimo	anônimo	Both forms remain	anonymous
Different pronunciation	Vénus	Vênus	Both forms remain	Venus
Different pronunciation	facto	fato	Both forms remain	fact
Different pronunciation	ideia	idéia	ideia	idea
Silent consonants	acção	ação	ação	action
Silent consonants	direcção	direção	direção	direction
Silent consonants	eléctrico	elétrico	elétrico	electric
Silent consonants	óptimo	ótimo	ótimo	optimal
Diacritics	pinguim	pingüim	pinguim	penguin
Diacritics	voo	vôo	voo	flight
Non-personal and non-geographical names	Janeiro	janeiro	janeiro	January

== Enacting ==
This spelling reform was meant to go into effect after all signatory countries had ratified it, but at the end of the decade only Brazil, Cape Verde, and Portugal had done so, so the agreement could not go into effect.

At the July 2004 summit of the Community of Portuguese Language Countries (including East Timor), São Tomé and Príncipe ratified the agreement, and a modification was made to the text, allowing the reform to go forward in those countries which had already ratified it, and accepting the official orthographies in the other countries as legitimate in the meantime; however, this was to happen after a transition period which was not defined.

The old orthographies continue to predominate in their respective countries until ratification of the 1990 agreement. Brazil changed on 1 January 2009.

The changes were accepted by Equatorial Guinea, which adopted Portuguese as one of its official languages on 13 July 2007.

In Portugal the change was signed into law on 21 July 2008 by the president allowing for a six-year transitional period, during which both orthographies co-existed. On 1 January 2012 the government adopted the spelling reform in official documents and in the Diário da República. The transition period ended on 12 May 2015. As of January 2016, transitions have also ended in Cape Verde and Brazil, making the reformed Portuguese orthography obligatory in three of the nine lusophone countries.

== See also ==
- Portuguese orthography
- Reforms of Portuguese orthography
- Portuguese Orthographic Reform of 1911
- 1943 Portuguese Orthographic Form
