= 1943 Portuguese Orthographic Form =

Portuguese language instruction set

The 1943 Portuguese Orthographic Form, approved on 12 August 1943, is a set of instructions established by the Brazilian Academy of Letters for the subsequent creation of the Vocabulário Ortográfico da Língua Portuguesa (Orthographic Vocabulary of the Portuguese Language) in the same year. This document, along with the modifications made by Law 5,765 of 18 December 1971, regulates the spelling of Portuguese in Brazil. It was also incorporated and modified by the Orthographic Agreement of 1990.

== History ==
In an attempt to put an end to the orthographic differences between Portugal and Brazil, as a result of Portugal's incorporation of the Orthographic Reform of 1911, several meetings were held involving the Academies of the two countries, which resulted in a preliminary agreement signed in 1931. However, as the vocabularies that were published in 1940 (by the Lisbon Academy of Sciences) and 1943 (by the Brazilian Academy of Letters) still showed some differences, there was a need for further meetings in Lisbon, which led to the 1945 Orthographic Agreement. This agreement was legislated in Portugal, but in Brazil it was not ratified by the National Congress, and Brazilians still followed the 1943 Orthographic Form.

The implementation of the 1990 Orthographic Agreement - which brought a significant reduction in spelling differences between Brazilian Portuguese and European Portuguese - incorporates the 1943 Orthographic Form as well as the 1945 Orthographic Agreement.

== Text of the 1943 Orthographic Form ==
The text of the 1943 Orthographic Form consists of two parts:

- Introduction: made up of 12 articles, it outlined the fixing principles for the spelling of Brazilian Portuguese.
- Form Bases: made up of 17 bases, it presented the principles guiding the spelling of the Portuguese language in Brazil since 1943, with the modifications made by Law 5,765 of 18 December 1971.

=== Form Bases ===
1st Base - Alphabet: establishes the 23-letter structure of the Portuguese alphabet, allowing the use of the letters K, W and Y only in special cases.

2nd Base - K, W, Y: presents the graphical changes to terms that previously used these letters - k for qu (before e and i) or for c (before a, o and u). The w, was replaced by v or u, according to its phonetic value. The y was always replaced by i. The only exceptions were the letters that make up international abbreviations or are part of foreign anthroponyms.

3rd Base - H: this letter was retained only at the beginning of words whose etymology justified it, in the digraphs ch, lh and nh, in interjections and in compounds with a hyphen. It was abolished in compounds without a hyphen.

4th Base - Silent consonants: complete elimination of any consonants that are not pronounced, except for words that have variants with pronounced or unpronounced letters.

5th Base - SC: elimination of the sc at the beginning of words and retention only when words have already been formed.

6th Base - Doubled letters: retention of the rr and ss groups with a single sound and the cc (or cç) group with distinct sounds.

7th Base - Nasal vowels: fixing the spelling of these vowels.

8th Base - Diphthongs: rules for spelling oral and nasal diphthongs.

9th Base - Vowel hiatus: use of oe and ue in verbs ending in oar and uar in the 1st, 2nd and 3rd singular of the subjunctive.

10th Base - Paronyms and double-spelled words: fixing the spellings of e/i, o/u, c/q, ch/x, g/j, s/ss/c/ç, s/x, s/z and the multiple phonetic values of x.

11th Base - Proper nouns: Form's rules for aportuguesamento and proper names. Except for toponyms with a historical tradition, such as "Bahia".

12th Base - Graphic accentuation: rules for spelling accents in oxytones, paroxytones and proparoxytones.

13th Base - Apostrophe: only for the suppression of letters in verses, reproduction of popular pronunciations, suppression of vowels in compound words that have been consecrated by usage, such as d'oeste, d'alho, d'arco, etc.

14th Base - Hyphen: use of hyphens in verbs and compound words with prefixes and suffixes, as well as verbs.

15th Base - Syllabic division: determined that syllabic separation should be done by spelling and no longer by etymology.

16th Base - Use of capital letters: presented the rules for the use of capital letters, excluding them for months of the year, cardinal points, names of peoples and nationalities.

17th Base - Punctuation marks: use of quotation marks (double quotation marks), parentheses, dashes and periods.

== Spelling of Brazilian Portuguese before the 1943 reform ==
=== Orthographic rules ===
Some rules regarding the morphology of Portuguese, in Brazil before 1943, in Portugal before 1911, many similar to those of English and French (still in progress).

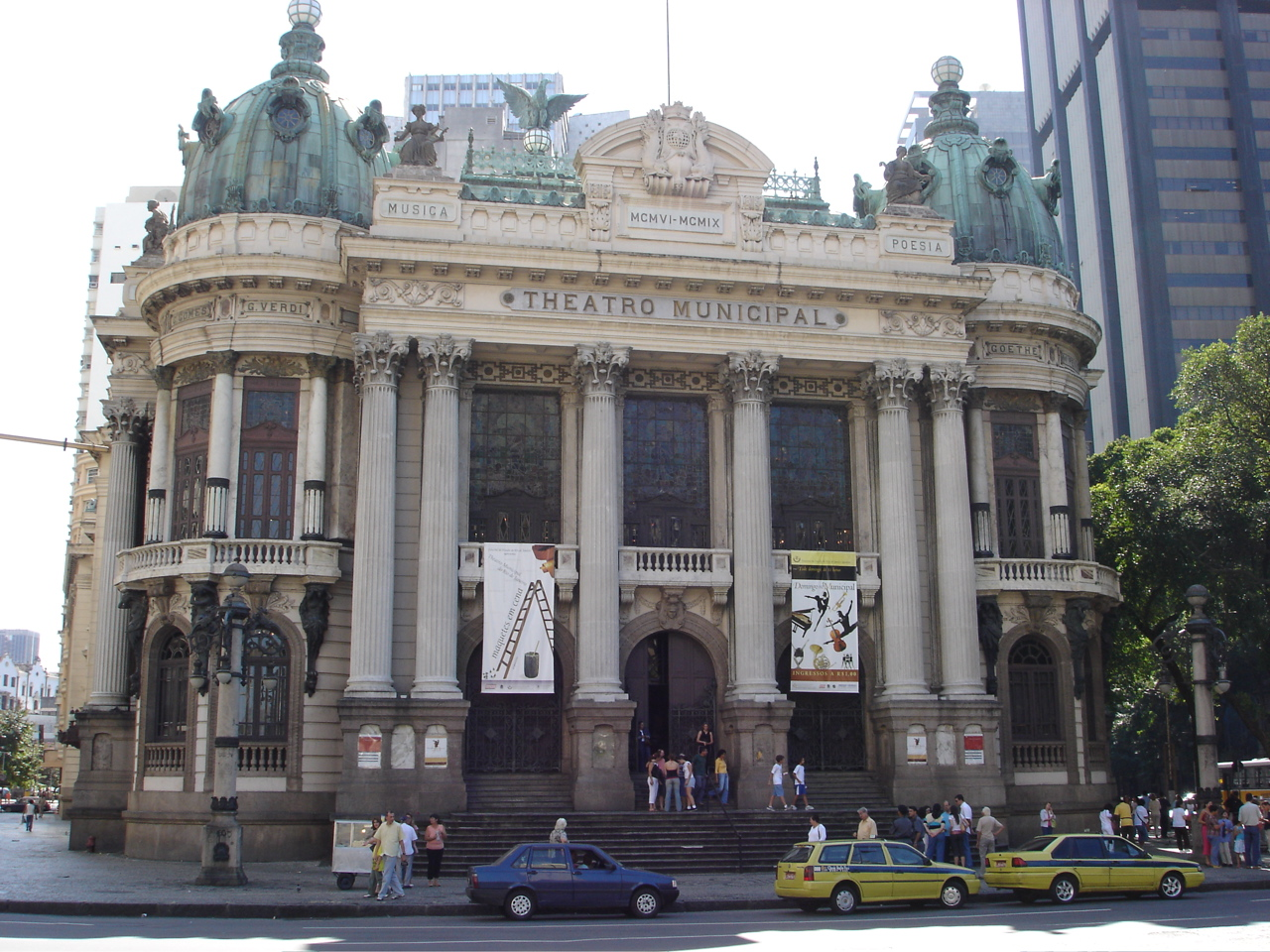
Remaining inscription of the extinct orthography at the Municipal Theater of Rio: THEATRO MUNICIPAL

Use of the following consonant clusters:

- Doubled consonant = used where etymology justified it, as in difficil (difficult, Latin difficilis) and cavallo (horse, Latin caballum);
- CH (K sound) = used in words of Greek origin, where the letter Χ (chi) is used, as in christão (χριστιανός) and architectura (Αρχιτεκτονική);
- MM = obeyed the original Latin spelling, as in commercio (commercium), where the first M represented the nasal sound before the syllabic M;
- MN = a similar case to the previous one, differing only in the nasal M sound preceded by N, as in alumno (student) and columna (column);
- PH = used in words of Greek origin, where the letter Φ (phi) is used, as in pharmacia (φάρμακον) and philosophia (φιλοσοφία);
- TH = was used in words of Greek origin, where the letter Θ (theta) is used, as in theatro (θέατρον) and thorax (θώραξ);
- XH = was commonly used in cases of juxtaposition of the prefix ex with the letter H, as in exhibição (exhibition) or exhalação (exhalation).

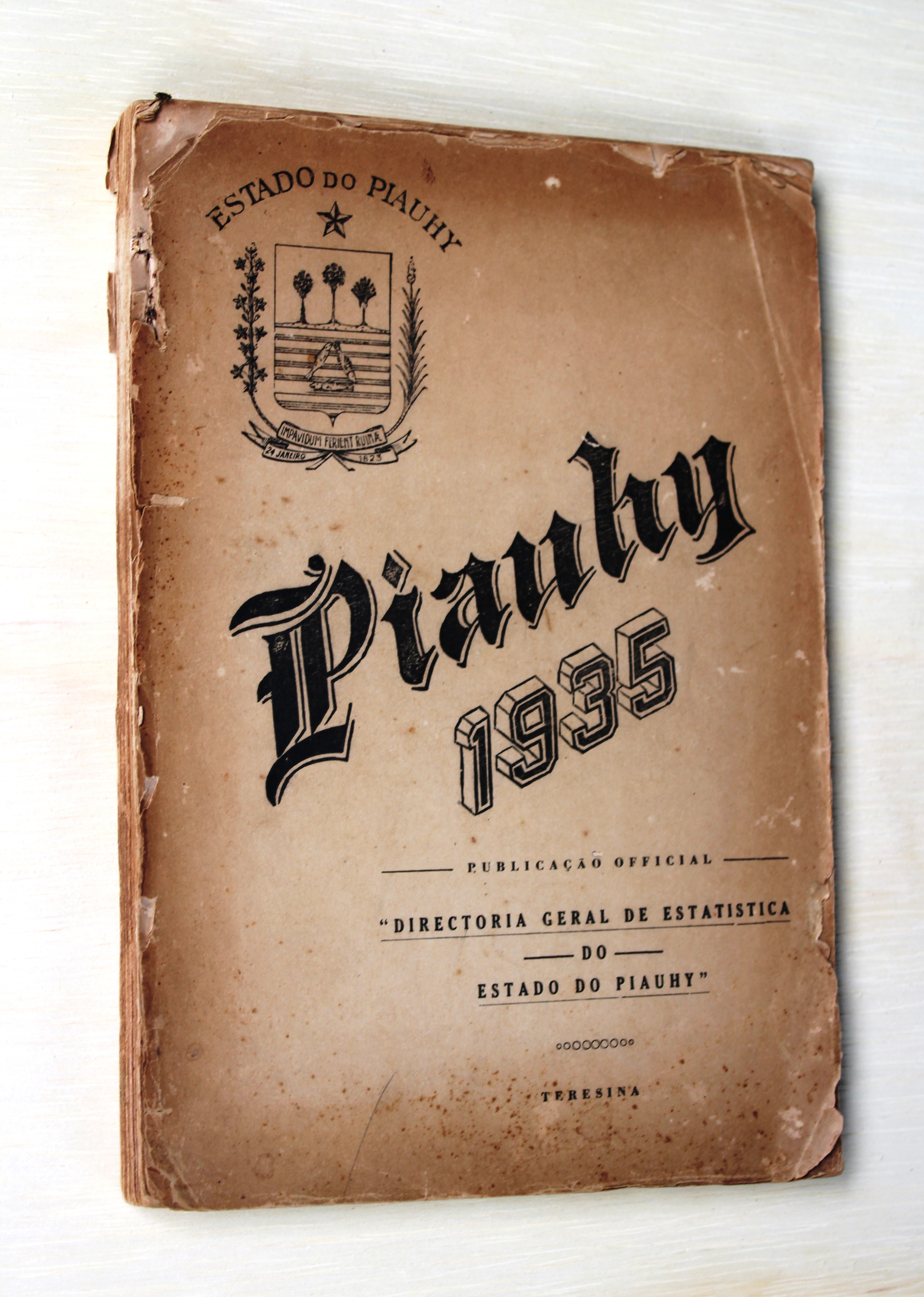
Published in 1935, Piauí was spelled "Piauhy".

In compliance with the rules described above, prefixes and suffixes of Greek origin were written as follows:

- Grapho (to write, to engrave) = PH was used in place of the current F, as in caligraphia and telegraphista;
- Hydro (water) = used Y, as in hydrographia;
- Hyper (very) = used Y, as in hyperbole and hypertrophia;
- Poly (innumerable, various) = used Y, as in polytechnica and polygono;
- Phono (sound, voice) = PH was used, as in telephone and phonographo;
- Photo (light) = used PH, as in photographia;
- Theca (collection) = T followed by H, as in bibliotheca (Greek: βιβλιοθήκη) and pinacotheca (πινακοθήκη).

Specific endings:

- EZ = replaced by the current ÊS, as in mez (month) and portuguez (Portuguese);
- OS = replaced by US, as in Deos (God) and Ilhéos (Ilhéus);
- Plural of "AL" = words like animal (animal) and vegetal (vegetable), which are now pluralized as animais and vegetais, used to be animaes and vegetaes, with ES instead of IS;

The H between vowels:

- It preceded stressed vowels and in hiatus, as in Jahu (Jaú) and sahida (exit).

Enclisis

- For example, in amá-la (love her), the L was separated from the pronoun and joined to the word: amal-a.

=== Origins ===
This spelling, which preceded 1911 in Portugal and 1943 in Brazil, emerged around the middle of the 17th century and was developed by Portuguese linguists. One of the main reasons for the use of this spelling system, in addition to the modernization of the language, was the Portuguese language's attempt to distance itself from Spanish. From 1580 to 1640, Portugal shared a dynastic union with Spain, a period known as the Iberian Union. And a very common theory in Spain at the time was that Portuguese was a dialect of Spanish. Obviously, this Spanish theory was created in order to act as a "tool" for greater domination over the Portuguese. This theory is perpetuated in relation to Galician, which is alternatively considered to be one of the dialects of the Galician-Portuguese linguistic system, alongside Iberian Portuguese and Brazilian Portuguese.

== Bibliography ==
- HOUAISS, Antônio. A nova ortografia da língua portuguesa. [The new spelling of the Portuguese language] São Paulo, Ática, 1991. (in Brazilian Portuguese)

== See also ==
- Portuguese orthography
- Reforms of Portuguese orthography
- Portuguese Orthographic Reform of 1911
- Portuguese Language Orthographic Agreement of 1990

Preceded by Portuguese Orthographic Reform of 1911	Portuguese language orthographic reforms 1943	Succeeded by 1945 Portuguese Orthographic Agreement
