= Campo de Besteiros =

- Civil parish
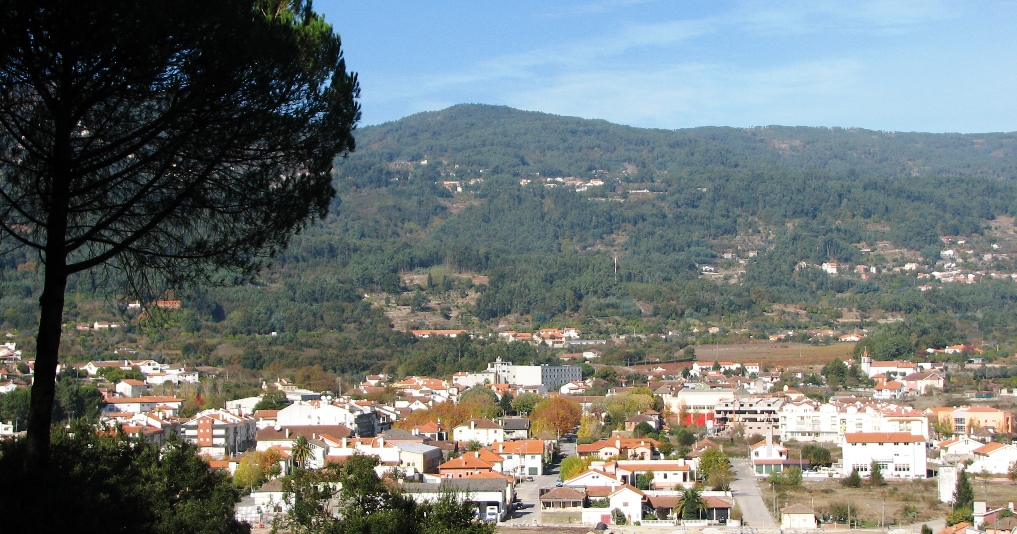

- Location in Portugal
- Coordinates: 40.556°N 8.135°W
- Country: Portugal
- Region: Centro
- Intermunic. comm.: Viseu Dão Lafões
- District: Viseu
- Municipality: Tondela

Area
  - Total: 7.93 km^{2} (3.06 sq mi)

Population (2011)
  - Total: 1,474
  - Density: 186/km^{2} (481/sq mi)
- Time zone: UTC+00:00 (WET)
  - Summer (DST): UTC+01:00 (WEST)

Campo de Besteiros is a civil parish in the municipality of Tondela, Portugal. The population in 2011 was 1,474, in an area of 7.93 km^{2}.
