= Guilherme de Vasconcelos Abreu =

Guilherme de Vasconcelos Abreu (1842-1907) was a Portuguese writer, cartographer and orientalist.

== Biography ==
Guilherme de Vasconcelos Abreu was born in Coimbra in 1842. Abreu spent a lifetime studying languages. He travelled to Brazil and went on several journeys to Portuguese colonies in India. He was particularly interested in the ancient language of Sanskrit.

He was involved with redesigning the Portuguese language in terms of its spelling. One of his students, Aniceto dos Reis Gonçalves Viana, led the commission that advised on how the spelling of Portuguese should be reformed. This change was successfully made, but created a rift with Brazil who continued to use the traditional spelling.

He was elected to the Portuguese Academy of Sciences on 9 February 1887.

A book he wrote in 1902 consisted of translations from ancient books, including the Sutta-pitaka, Ramayana and the Mahabharata. The book was titled Os Contos, Apólogos e Fábulas da Índia (or Tales, apologists, and Fables of India) This was the first book to define the term yoga in Portuguese.

== Works ==
- Curso de Literatura e Língua Sânscrita Clássica e Védica (1879–98), (Sanskrit language course in five volumes).
- Bases da ortografia portuguesa (1885) (Portuguese language—Orthography and spelling)
- Os Contos, Apólogos e Fábulas da Índia (Tales, apologists, and Fables of India), 1902
