= Parada de Gonta =

- Civil parish
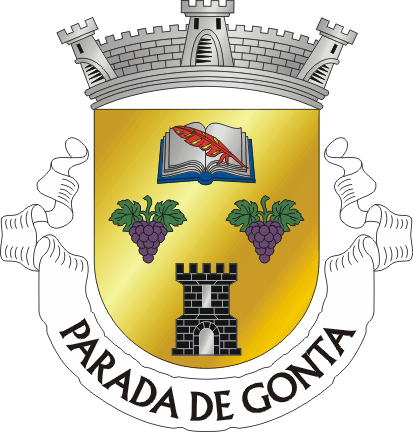
- Coat of arms

- Location in Portugal
- Coordinates: 40.582°N 7.996°W
- Country: Portugal
- Region: Centro
- Intermunic. comm.: Viseu Dão Lafões
- District: Viseu
- Municipality: Tondela

Area
  - Total: 6.73 km^{2} (2.60 sq mi)

Population (2011)
  - Total: 754
  - Density: 110/km^{2} (290/sq mi)
- Time zone: UTC+00:00 (WET)
  - Summer (DST): UTC+01:00 (WEST)
- Website: http://paradadegonta.org

Parada de Gonta is a Portuguese parish of the municipality of Tondela. The population in 2011 was 754, in an area of 6.73 km^{2}.
