= Sociedade Propagadora dos Conhecimentos Úteis =

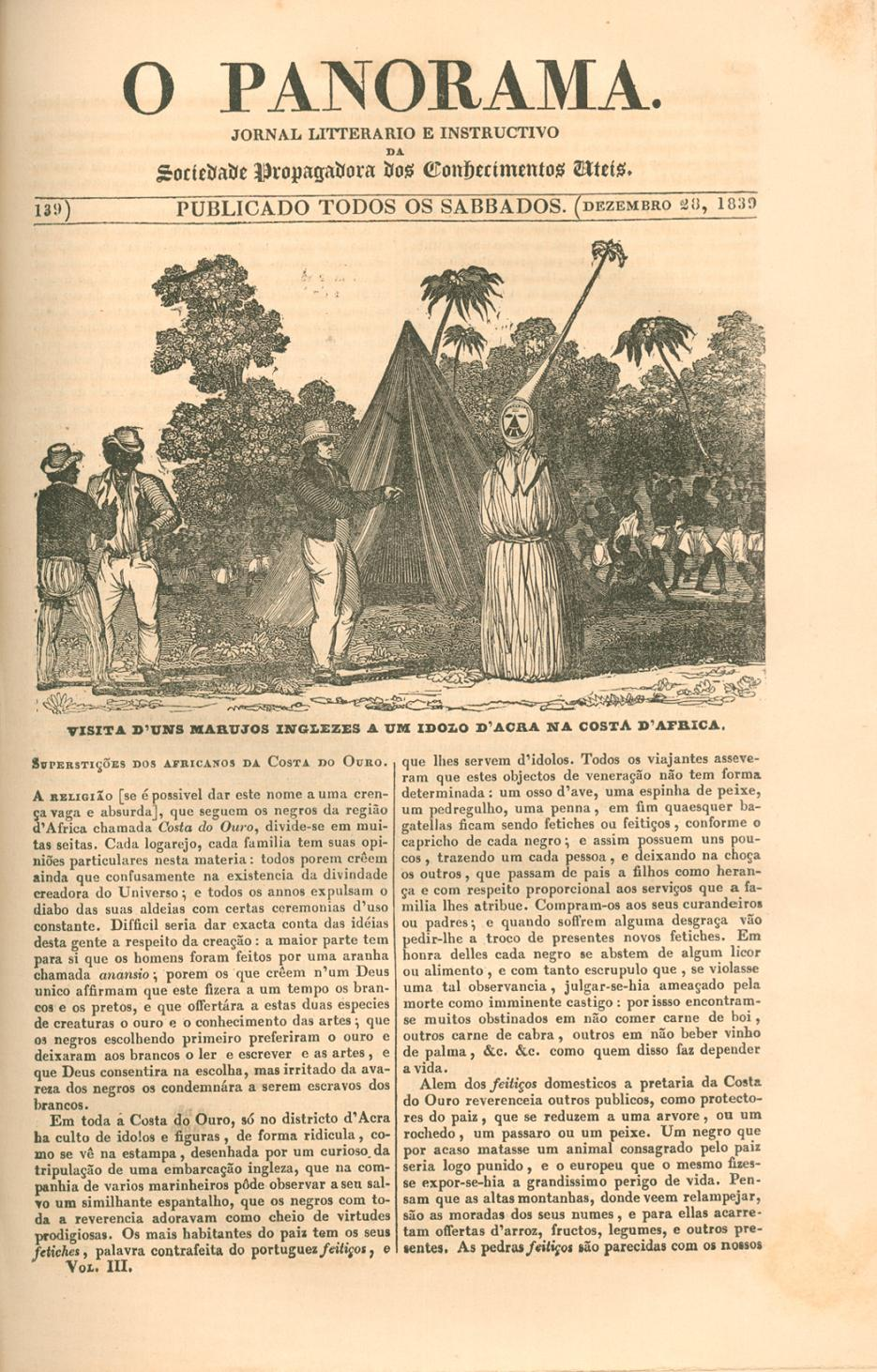
Cover of O Panorama, 1839, depicting scene in vicinity of Accra, Gold Coast

The Sociedade Propagadora dos Conhecimentos Úteis (Society for the Diffusion of Useful Knowledge) of Lisbon, Portugal, formed in 1837. The group produced a weekly illustrated magazine, O Panorama, intended for the general interest reader and priced relatively affordably. According to the society, some copies were also distributed free of charge to charities such as Casa Pia orphanage and Casa de Expostos. Editors included Alexandre Herculano, António Feliciano de Castilho, and António de Oliveira Marreca. Other contributors included Rodrigo Jose de Lima Felner.

In addition to the magazine, the society published works by authors such as Luís da Silva Mouzinho de Albuquerque, José Ferreira Borges, Manuel Godinho de Erédia, Francisco José Freire, Almeida Garrett, and Inácio Pizarro de Morais Sarmento. Its printing press operated from Rua do Carmo in Baixa Pombalina.

The society formed during a post-civil war era of liberalized civil society in Portugal. Organizations with similar educational missions included the Sociedade das Ciências Médicas e da Literatura (est. 1833), Sociedade Promotora da Indústria Nacional (reactivated in 1834), Sociedade dos Amigos das Letras (est. 1836).^{(pt)}

== See also ==
- O Panorama periodical, 1837-1868

== Bibliography ==
- Estatutos da Sociedade Propagadora de Conhecimentos Úteis (in Portuguese), 1837
- Diário do Governo (in Portuguese), 21 February 1837, "Sociedade Propagadora dos Conhecimentos Úteis"
- José Silvestre Ribeiro [in Portuguese] (1879). "Sociedade Propagadora dos Conhecimentos Uteis". Historia dos estabelecimentos scientificos, litterarios e artisticos de Portugal (in Portuguese). Vol. 8. Lisbon: Academia Real das Sciencias. OCLC 2753153 – via Internet Archive.
- Maria Cristina Nogueira Lanca de Mello (1971). O Panorama: história de um jornal (in Portuguese). Universidade de Lisboa, Faculdade de Letras.
- João Bartolomeu Rodrigues (2008). A Educação na Revista O Panorama (PhD) (in Portuguese). Universidade de Trás-os-Montes e Alto Douro. hdl:10348/108.
- Benedita de Cássia Lima Sant'Anna (2009). "O Panorama (1837-1868): história de um Jornal". Patrimônio e Memória (in Portuguese). 4. Universidade Estadual Paulista "Júlio de Mesquita Filho". hdl:11449/107544. ISSN 1808-1967.
- Rita Correia (2012), Ficha histórica: O Panorama, jornal literário e instrutivo da sociedade propagadora dos conhecimentos úteis (PDF) (in Portuguese), Hemeroteca Municipal de Lisboa
- Michelle Fernanda Tasca (2013). A história contada pelos periódicos: O Panorama e a história de Portugal (in Portuguese). Brasil: Associação Nacional de História. ISBN 978-85-98711-11-9.
