= Tomás Ribeiro (writer) =

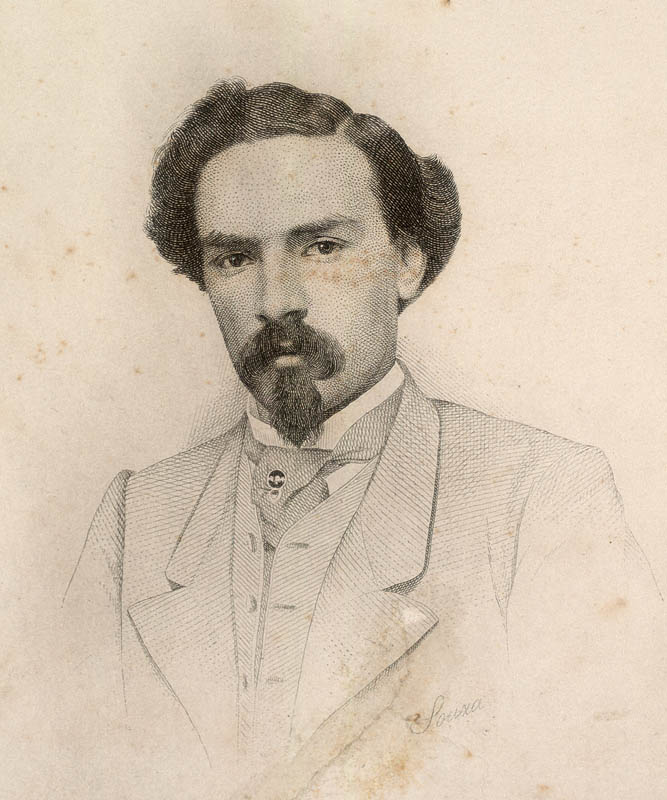
- Born: 1 July 1831; Parada de Gonta, Viseu, Portugal
- Died: 6 February 1901 (aged 69); Lisbon, Portugal
- Occupations: Politician, journalist, poet and writer

Tomás António Ribeiro Ferreira (1 July 1831 – 6 February 1901), better known as Tomás Ribeiro or Thomaz Ribeiro, was a Portuguese politician, journalist, poet and Ultra-Romantic writer.

He was born in Parada de Gonta, Viseu. After graduating in law at the University of Coimbra, he practised law briefly before turning to a political career. A prominent member of the Partido Regenerador, he was at various times Mayor of Viseu, Deputy, Peer of the Realm, Minister of Maritime Affairs, Minister of Public Works and Civil Governor of the districts of Braga and Porto. He was also secretary general of the government of Portuguese India, and ambassador of Portugal in Brazil. Elected a member of the Royal Academy of Sciences, he was president of the Department of Letters. He died in Lisbon and was buried in the Cemitério dos Prazeres.

Viewed as a versatile writer and journalist, Tomás Ribeiro left a vast body of work. He was the father of the poet Branca de Gonta Colaço and grandfather of the writer Tomás Ribeiro Colaço.

== Selected works ==
- D. Jaime ou a dominação de Castela, nationalist poem, 1862
- A Delfina do Mal, poetry, 1868
- Sons que Passam, poetry, 1868
- A Indiana entr'acte in verse, 1873
- Vésperas, 1880
- Jornadas, travel writing, 1873
  - 1.ª parte - Do Tejo ao Mandovi
  - 2.ª parte - Entre Palmeiras
  - 3.ª parte - Entre Primores
- Dissonâncias, 1890
- História da Legislação Liberal Portuguesa, essay, 1891-1892
- Empréstimo de D. Miguel, essay, 1880
- O Mensageiro de Fez, poem in praise of Our Lady of Carnaxide, 1900.
