= Tondela =

- Municipality
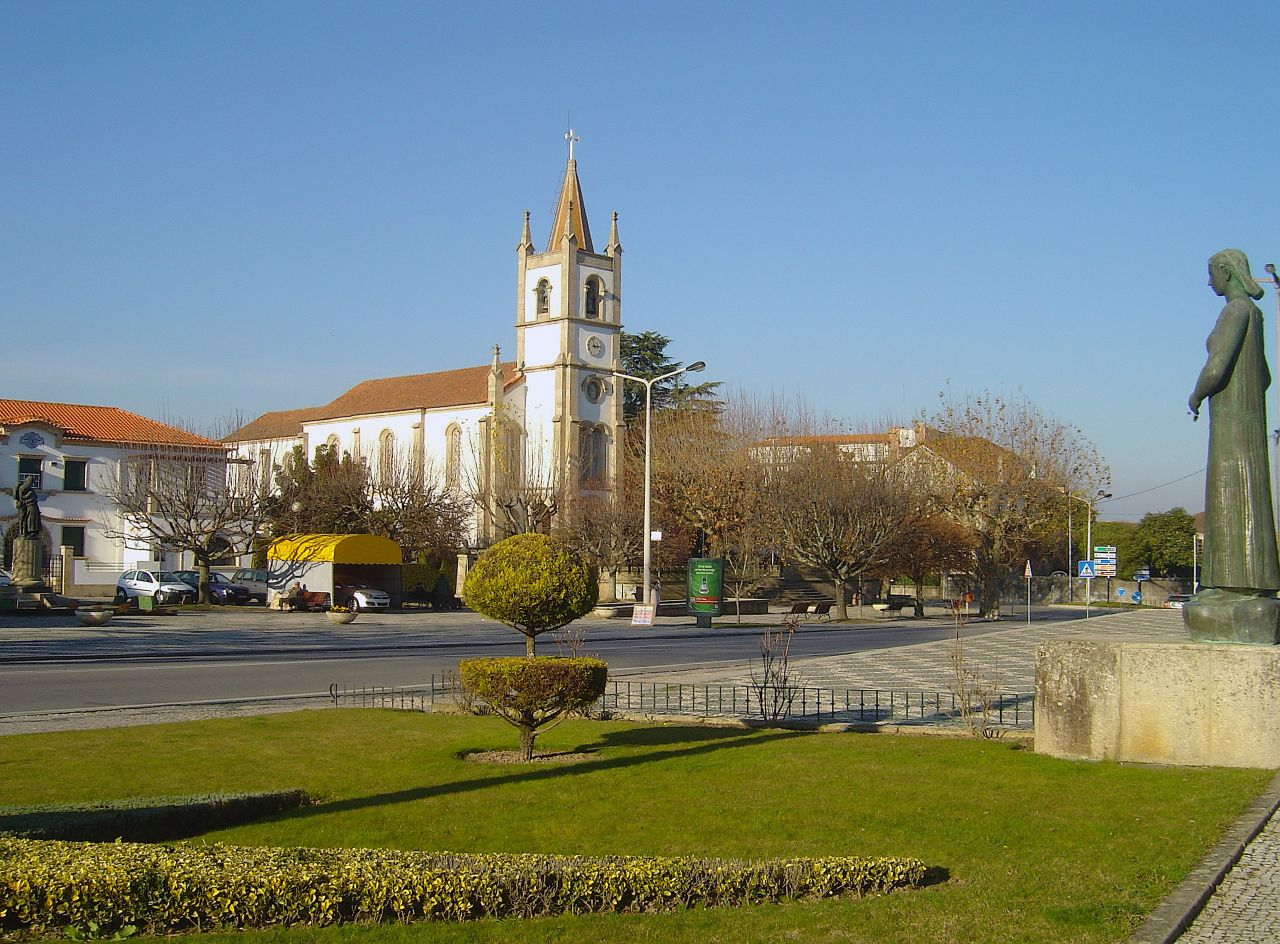
- View of Tondela

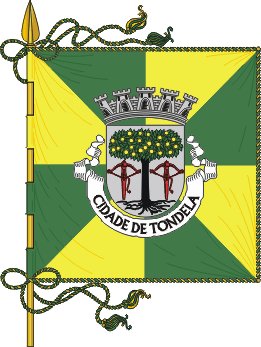
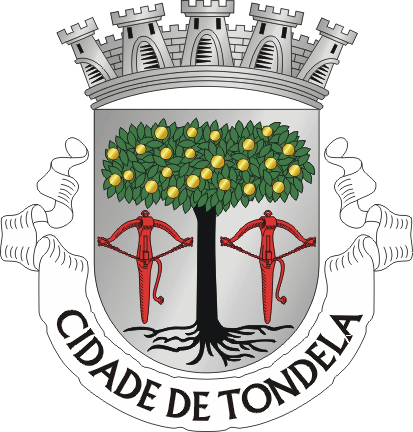
- Flag Coat of arms
- Interactive map of Tondela
- Coordinates: 40°31′N 8°5′W
- Country: Portugal
- Region: Centro
- Intermunic. comm.: Viseu Dão Lafões
- District: Viseu
- Parishes: 19

Government
  - President: José António Gomes Jesus (PPD-PSD)

Area
  - Total: 371.22 km^{2} (143.33 sq mi)

Population (2011)
  - Total: 28,946
  - Density: 77.975/km^{2} (201.96/sq mi)
- Time zone: UTC+00:00 (WET)
  - Summer (DST): UTC+01:00 (WEST)
- Postal code: 3464
- Area code: 232
- Patron: Nossa Senhora do Carmo
- Website: http://www.cm-tondela.pt

Tondela (Portuguese pronunciation: [tõˈdɛlɐ]) is a municipality in the central Portuguese subregion of Dão-Lafões. The population in 2011 was 28,946, in an area of 371.22 km^{2}.

== History ==
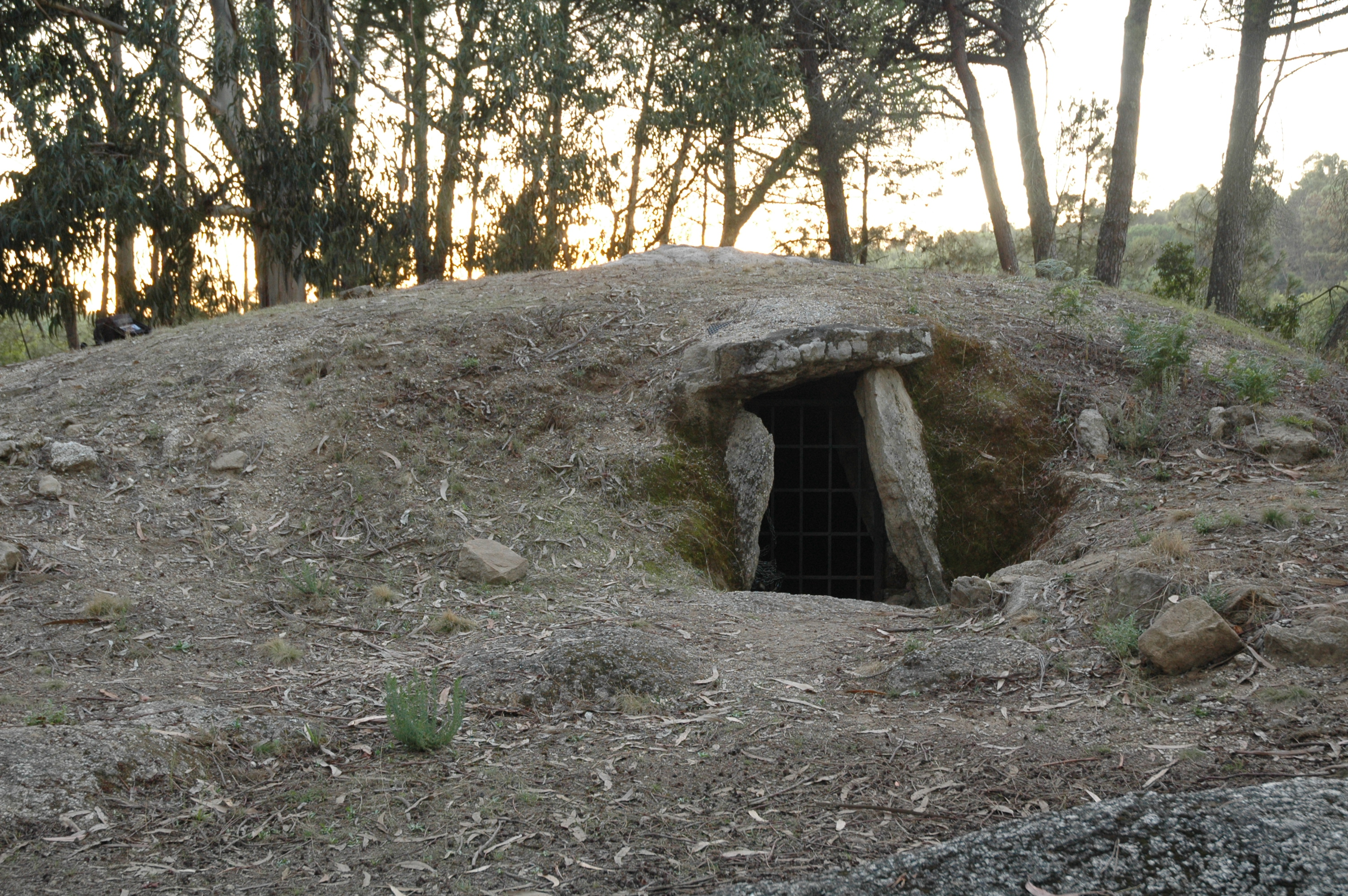
The mound of Anta da Arquinha da Moura: vestiges of prehistoric cultures

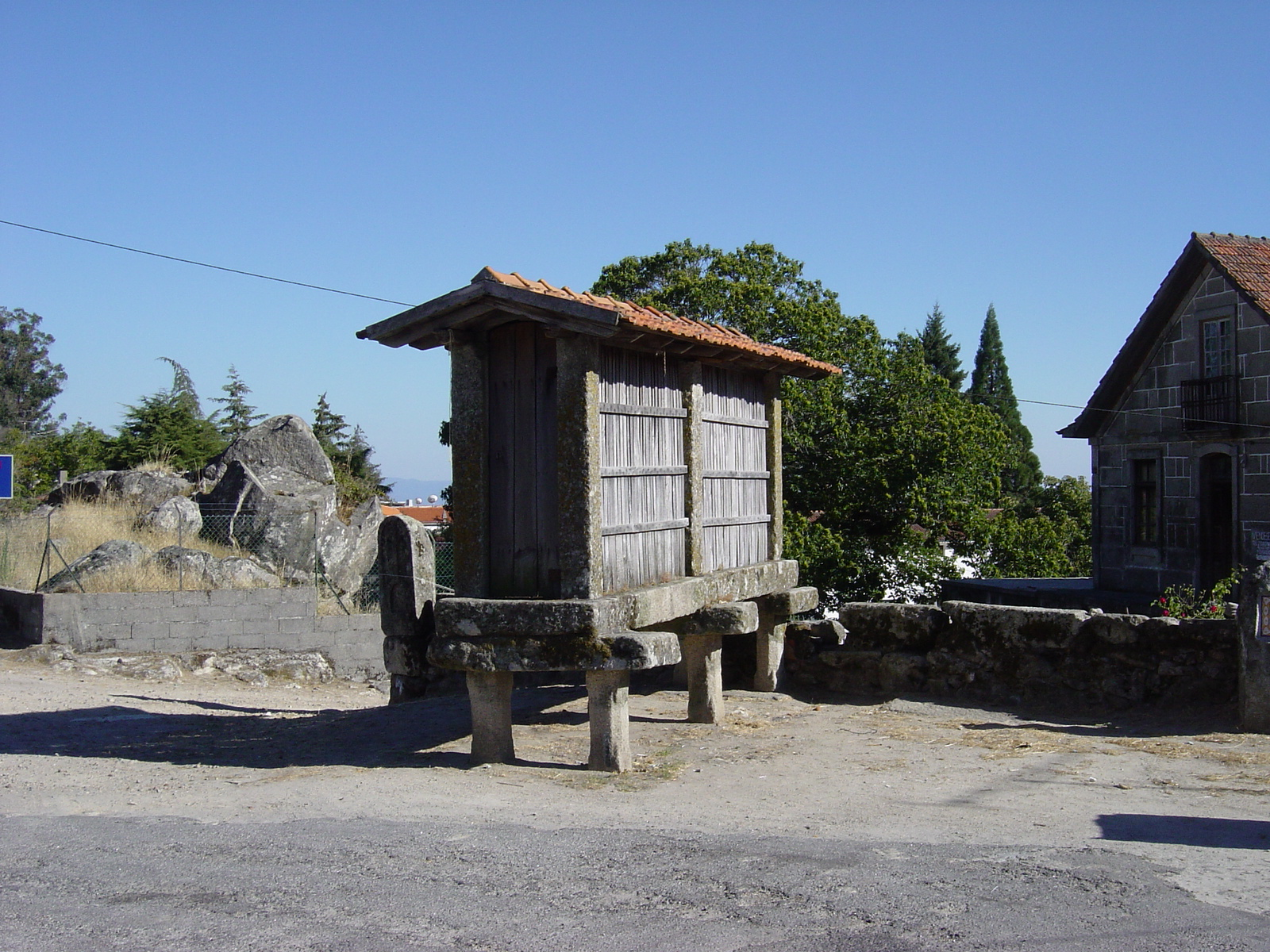
The ancient espigueiro (granary) used by local people to dry and store corn

Local writer and intellectual Amadeu Ferraz de Carvalho (1876–1951) wrote of the municipality of Tondela in the following terms:

"The municipality of Tondela extends over the plateau, covers part of the eastern slope of Caramulo and surpassing the saw still slopes through the highlands of São João do Monte, over the gentle flanks of the upper Águeda basin. In this way, the natural sections of your area are: part of the plateau, cut by the Dão and its effluents the Paiva and Dinha [rivers]; the depressed lands between the plateau and the Serra do Caramulo, drained by the Criz [River] and its effluents; a part of the eastern flanks of the Caramulanian mountains and elevated east around the Águeda basin; and I add, an extreme basin, with Quaternary deposits, that indicate small extinct lakes, along the Serra do Caramulo; and the Vale de Besteiros."

In this context, the region of Tondela appears as one of the principal locations of archaeological remnants and concentrations of prehistoric populations.

The traditional origin of the name Tondela is made concrete at Chafariz das Sereias (literally, "Spring of the Mermaids"), a sculpted spring of stone depicting a woman holding a trumpet. Legend suggests this female figure represents a woman who monitored the movements of Moorish forces across the mountains from her lookout. When she discovered an impending attack she would sound the horn, and at the sound of this instrument the settlers would arise to meet the enemy. The phrase "ao'tom'dela"—literally, "at her sound" or "at the sound of it"—was transformed into the name Tondela.

Documents from the 9th, 10th, and 12th century designate this region, Terra de Balistariis. This designation arises from the word ballista, a ranged weapon used by besteiros ("crossbowmen") during the Middle Ages.

The current municipality was until 1836 the seat of the historical municipality of Besteiros, whose name continues to be seen in some historical documents, references, and coat of arms of Tondela. To this former administrative division were annexed through successive administrative reforms the older entities of Serra do Caramulo, São João do Monte, and Guardão. The lowlands of Mouraz, Sabugosa, Canas de Santa Maria, São Miguel de Outeiro, and a few parishes that were part of Viseu or the smaller municipalities of Barreiro and Treixedo were also extended into Tondela.

== Geography ==
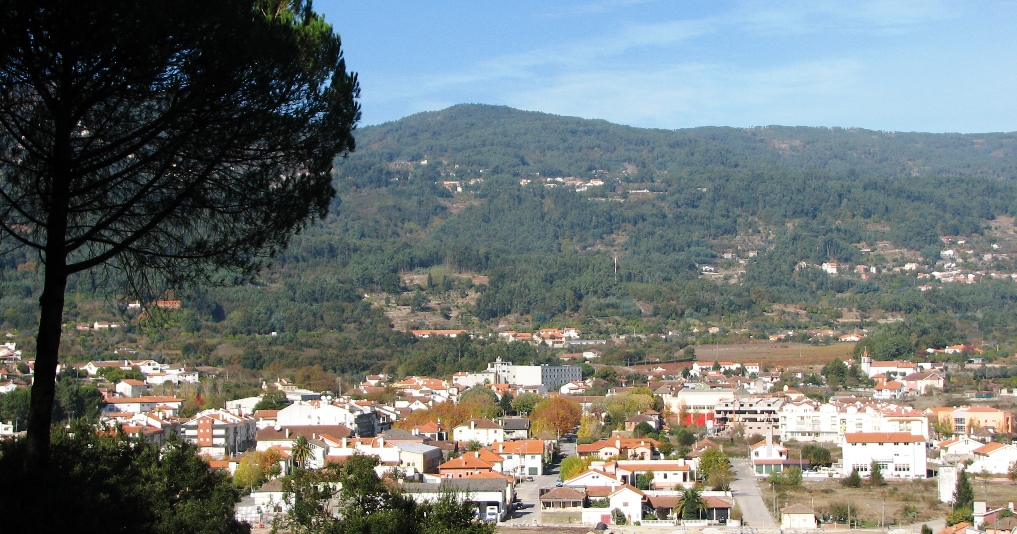
A view of Campo de Besteiros, located in the northwest-central mountains of Serra do Caramulo

Tondela is divided into 19 civil parishes (freguesias):

- Barreiro de Besteiros e Tourigo
- Campo de Besteiros
- Canas de Santa Maria
- Caparrosa e Silvares
- Castelões
- Dardavaz
- Ferreirós do Dão
- Guardão
- Lajeosa do Dão
- Lobão da Beira
- Molelos
- Mouraz e Vila Nova da Rainha
- Parada de Gonta
- Santiago de Besteiros
- São João do Monte e Mosteirinho
- São Miguel do Outeiro e Sabugosa
- Tonda
- Tondela e Nandufe
- Vilar de Besteiros e Mosteiro de Fráguas

== Sport ==
The Clube Desportivo de Tondela is the main sports club in the municipality. Its football team earned its first promotion to the Primeira Liga in 2016.

== Twin towns ==
- Lannemezan, France

== Notable citizens ==
- Tomás Ribeiro (1831 in Parada de Gonta – 1901) politician, journalist, poet, and writer
- Samuel Úria (born 1979), musician

=== Sport ===
- Nuno Claro (born 1977), football goalkeeper with 266 club caps
- Nuno Piloto (born 1982), footballer with over 300 club caps
- Rui Pedro Coimbra Chaves, known as Ruca (born 1990), footballer with over 250 club caps
