= Portuguese orthography =

Alphabet and spelling

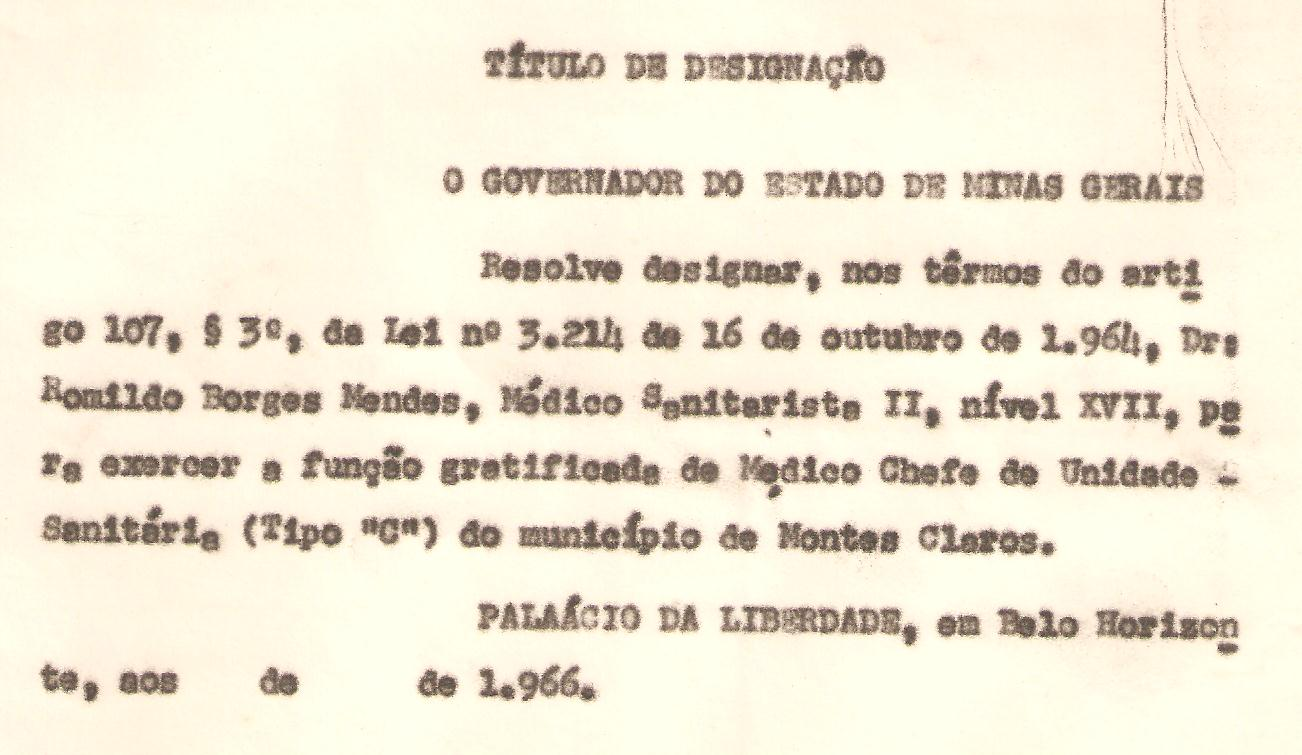
Typewritten text in Portuguese; note the acute accent, tilde, and circumflex accent.

Portuguese orthography is based on the Latin alphabet and makes use of the acute accent, the circumflex accent, the grave accent, the tilde, and the cedilla to denote stress, vowel height, nasalization, and other sound changes. The diaeresis was abolished by the last Orthography Agreement. Accented letters and digraphs are not counted as separate characters for collation purposes.

The spelling of Portuguese is largely phonemic, but some phonemes can be spelled in more than one way. In ambiguous cases, the correct spelling is determined through a combination of etymology with morphology and tradition; so there is not a perfect one-to-one correspondence between sounds and letters or digraphs. Knowing the main inflectional paradigms of Portuguese and being acquainted with the orthography of other Western European languages can be helpful.

A full list of sounds, diphthongs, and their main spellings is given at Portuguese phonology. This article addresses the less trivial details of the spelling of Portuguese as well as other issues of orthography, such as accentuation.

== Letter names and pronunciations ==
Only the most frequent sounds appear below since a listing of all cases and exceptions would become cumbersome. Portuguese is a pluricentric language, and pronunciation of some of the letters differs. Apart from those variations, the pronunciation of most consonants is fairly straightforward.

Although many letters have more than one pronunciation, their phonetic value is often predictable from their position within a word; that is normally the case for the consonants (except x). Since only five letters are available to write the fourteen vowel sounds of Portuguese, vowels have a more complex orthography, but even then, pronunciation is somewhat predictable. Knowing the main inflectional paradigms of Portuguese can help.

In the following table and in the remainder of this article, the phrase "at the end of a syllable" can be understood as "before a consonant, or at the end of a word". For the letter r, "at the start of a syllable (not between vowels)" means "at the beginning of a word or after l, n, s, or a prefix ending in a consonant". For letters with more than one common pronunciation, their most common phonetic values are given on the left side of the semicolon; sounds after it occur only in a limited number of positions within a word. Sounds separated by "~" are allophones or dialectal variants.

The names of the letters are masculine.

Letter	European		Brazilian		Phonemic values	Example	Example (IPA)
Letter	Name	Name (IPA)	Name	Name (IPA)	Phonemic values	Example	Example (IPA)
A a	á	/a/	á	/a/	/a/, /ɐ/	cara	[ˈkaɾɐ/ˈkaɾa]
B b	bê	/be/	bê	/be/	/b/ or [β] ^{nb 1}	bato	[ˈbatu(~ʊ)]
C c	cê	/se/	cê	/se/	/k/ ^{nb 2}; /s/ ^{nb 3}	conciso	[kõˈsi.zu(~ʊ)]
Ç ç	cêcidilha	/sɛsiðɪʎɐ/	cêcidilha	/sẽsid(ʒ)iʎɐ/	/s/	criança	[ˈkɾiɐ̃nsɐ]
D d	dê	/de/	dê	/de/	/d/ ~ [dʒ] ^{nb 4} or [ð] ^{nb 1}	dádiva	[ˈdaðivɐ/ˈdad(ʒ)ivɐ]
E e	é	/ɛ/	é or ê	/ɛ/, /e/	/e/, /ɛ/, /i/ ^{nb 5}, /ɨ/, /ɐ/, /ɐi/	rente	[ˈʀẽtə/ˈʁẽȷ̃t(ʃ)i]
F f	éfe	/ˈɛfɨ/	éfe	/ˈɛfi/	/f/ ^{nb 6}	fala	[ˈfa(~ɑ)lɐ]
G g	gê or guê	/ʒe/, /ɡe/	gê	/ʒe/	/ɡ/ or [ɣ] ^{nb 1}; /ʒ/ ^{nb 3}	ɡiɡante	[ʒiˈɣɐ̃ntə/ʒiˈɡɐ̃t(ʃ)i]
H h	agá	/ɐˈɡa/	agá	/aˈɡa/	natively silent, /ʁ/ in loanwords ^{nb 7}	homem	[ˈɔmɐ̃j/ˈõmẽj~ˈomẽ(ɲ)]
I i	i	/i/	i	/i/	/i/ ^{nb 5}	idade	[iˈðaðə/iˈdad(ʒ)i]
J j	jota	/ˈʒɔtɐ/	jota	/ˈʒɔtɐ/	/ʒ/ ^{nb 6}	janta	[ˈʒɐ̃(n)tɐ]
K k	cápa	/ˈkapɐ/	cá	/ˈka/	/k/	kiwi	[kiːwi]
L l	ele	/ˈɛlɨ/	éle	/ˈɛli/	/l/ ~ [ɫ ~ w] ^{nb 6} ^{nb 9}	lamaçal	[lɐmɐˈsa(~ɑ)ɫ/lamaˈsaw]
M m	eme	/ˈɛmɨ/	éme	/ˈemi/	/m/ ^{nb 6} ^{nb 10}	mala	[ˈma(~ɑ)lɐ]
N n	ene	/ˈɛnɨ/	éne	/ˈeni/	/n/ ^{nb 5} ^{nb 10}	ninho	[ˈniɲʊ], [ˈnĩj̃u]
O o	ó	/ɔ/	ó or ô	/ɔ/, /o/	/o/, /ɔ/, /u/ ^{nb 5}	óculos	[ˈɔkulu(~ʊ)s(/ʃ)]
P p	pê	/pe/	pê	/pe/	/p/	pato	[ˈpatu(~ʊ)]
Q q	quê	/ke/	quê	/ke/	/k/ ^{nb 2}	quente	[ˈkẽntə/ˈkẽt͡ʃi]
R r	erre or rê	/ˈɛʁɨ/, /ʁe/	érre	/ˈɛʁi/	/ɾ/, /ʁ/, /h/ ^{nb 11}, /ʀ/, /r/ ^{nb 6} ^{nb 11} /ɽ/	raro	[ˈʁ/ʀ/raɾu(~ʊ)]
S s	esse	/ˈɛsɨ/	ésse	/ˈɛsi/	/s/, /z/ ^{nb 12}, [ʃ] ^{nb 13} ~ [ʒ] ^{nb 6}	siso	[ˈsizu(~ʊ)]
T t	tê	/te/	tê	/te/	/t/ ~ [tʃ] ^{nb 4} or [θ] ^{nb 14}	tente	[ˈtẽntə/ˈtẽt͡ʃi]
U u	u	/u/	u	/u/	/u/ ^{nb 5}	urubu	[uɾuˈbu] ([uɾuˈβu])
V v	vê	/ve/	vê	/ve/	/v/ or /β~b/ ^{nb 15}	vaca	[ˈvakɐ] ([ˈbakɐ])
W w	dâblio or duplo vê	/ˈdɐbliu/, /ˈdupluˌve/	dáblio	/ˈdabliu/	/u/, /v/ or /w/^{nb 16}	watt	[ˈwaːt]
X x	xis	/ʃiʃ/	xis	/ʃis/	/ʃ/, /ks/, /z/, /s/, /gz/ ^{nb 12} ^{nb 17}	xale	[ˈʃa(~ɑ)lə/ˈʃali]
Y y	ípsilon or i grego	/ˈipsɨlɔn/, /ˌi ˈgrɛgu/	ípsilon	/ˈipsilõ/	/i/ or /j/	yeti	[jɛtiː]
Z z	zê	/ze/	zê	/ze/	/z/, /s/, /ʃ/ ^{nb 13} ~ [ʒ]	zunir	[zuˈniɾ̥(ə)/zũ.ˈ(n)iɾ~∅]

Brazilian Portuguese Alphabet
Listen to the alphabet recited by a native speaker from Brazil. The alphabet is spoken in a Brazilian dialect in which 'e' is pronounced /ɛ/

European Portuguese Alphabet
Listen to the alphabet recited by a native speaker from Portugal. The alphabet is spoken in a European dialect in which 'g' is pronounced /ɡe/, 'r' is pronounced /ˈɛʁɨ/, 'w' is pronounced /ˈdɐbliu/ and 'y' is pronounced /ˈipsɨlɔn/

=== Notes ===
1. The letters b, d, g can denote [β], [ð], and [ɣ] in intervocalic positions, especially in northern and central Portugal. In Mozambique an intervocalic /d/ can be realized as [d.ð] or [dː], mostly before a final e-caduc or reduced /o/. In other intervocalic schemes can be realized also as [ð] of European variety.
2. /k/ can be realized in Mozambique as [kʰ], mostly before a final e-caduc or reduced /o/.
3. Before the letters e or i.
4. Allophonically affricated before the sound /i/ (spelled i, or sometimes e), in BP.
5. May become an approximant as a form of vowel reduction when unstressed before or after another vowel. Words such as boia and proa are pronounced [ˈbɔj.jɐ] and [ˈpɾow.wɐ].
6. The letters f, j, l, m, n, r and s are sometimes named differently in the northwest region of Brazil: fê, ji, lê, mê, nê, rê, sê.
7. Silent at the start or at the end of a word. Also part of the digraphs ch, lh, nh. See below.
8. The letters K (called capa /ˈkapɐ/ in EP or cá /ka/ in BP), W (EP: dâblio /ˈdɐbliu/ or duplo vê /ˈduplu ˌve/, BP: dáblio /ˈdabliu/), and Y (EP: ípsilon /ˈipsɨlɔn/ or i grego /ˌi ˈgrɛgu/, BP: ípsilon /ˈipsilõ/) were not part of the official alphabet before 2009. They are used only in foreign words, personal names, and hybrid words derived from them. The letters K, W and Y will be included in the alphabet used in East Timor, Macau, Angola, Mozambique, Guinea-Bissau, and São Tomé and Príncipe, when the 1990 Portuguese Language Orthographic Agreement comes into legal effect. In Brazil, the Orthographic Agreement went into legal effect from 1 January 2009; in Portugal, from 13 May 2009; in Cabo Verde, from 1 October 2009. However, those letters were used before 1911 (see the article on spelling reform in Portugal).
9. Velarized to [ɫ] in EP and conservative registers of southern BP. Vocalized to [u̯], [ʊ̯], or seldom [o̯] (as influence from Spanish or Japanese), at the end of syllables in most of Brazil.
10. Usually silent or voiceless at the end of syllables (word-final n is fully pronounced by some speakers in a few loaned words). See Nasalization section, below.
11. At the start of syllables (not between vowels) in most of the dialects or at the end of syllables (in some dialects of BP), a single graphical r is pronounced /ʁ/ or /ɻ/~/ɽ/~/ɹ/ (see Portuguese phonology for variants of this sound). However, in the moribund dialect of the interior of São Paulo it can be realized as /ɽ/ even in consonant clusters, such as [bɽ], [dɽ], [fɽ], [gɽ], [kɽ], [pɽ], [tɽ], or after /j/. After /l/ can be assimiled and realized as [ɽ.r], e.g. melro [mˈɛɽ.rʊ]. In European dialects word-initial or preceded by /n/, /l/, /s/ ([dʒ]) or nasalisation can be pronounced as very intense /ʁ/, /ʀ/, or /r/ (latter — as in Galician). Elsewhere, it is pronounced as /ɾ/ and its variants. Word-final rhotics may also be silent when the last syllable is stressed, in casual and vernacular speech, especially in Brazil (pervasive nationwide, though not in educated and some colloquial registers) and in some African and Asian countries. In European variety a word-initial /r/ can be realised as [r̝] after /s/. Word(or coda)-final European variants of /ɾ/ include [ɾ̥], [r̝], [r̻], and [ɻ̊]. Sometimes a non-phonematic [ə] is added after a final /ɾ/.
12. A single s is pronounced voiced [z] between vowels.
13. The opposition between the four sibilants /s/, /z/, /ʃ/, /ʒ/ is neutralized at the end of syllables; see below for more information.
14. Letter t, surrounded by nasal vowels (realized always as nasal vowel + [n] before it), /f/, /j/, /l/, /r/, /ʃ/, /w/, and stops, can be read as allophonic [θ] in some Mozambican varieties. Mostly before final reduced vowels can be realized there also as [tʰ]. The same pattern of aspiration for /t/ occurs in East Timorese Portuguese.
15. Northern Portuguese dialects share with Galician and other, more distantly related, North Iberian languages (Astur-Leonese, including Mirandese, Castilian, Aragonese, Catalan and, to some extent, Basque) one common feature — merger of /b/ and /v/ into /β~b/.
16. The letter w is also pronounced /v/ in German loanwords and names.
17. The letter x may represent /ʃ/, /ks/, /z/, /s/, or [gz] (peixe, fixar, exemplo, próximo, hexágono). It is always pronounced /ʃ/ at the beginning of words and /ks/ at the end of words.

== Digraphs ==
Portuguese uses digraphs, pairs of letters which represent a single sound different from the sum of their components. Digraphs are not included in the alphabet.

Grapheme	Pronunciation
ch	/tʃ/
lh	/ʎ/, [lʲ], [lj] or [ɬ]
ng	/ŋ/
nh	/ɲ/, [j̃]
ph	/f/
rh	/ɹ/
rr	/ʁ/
sh	/ʃ/
ss	/s/
th	/θ/
wh	/w/
zh	/ʒ/
qu	/k/; /kʷ/
gu	/ɡ/; /ɡʷ/; /ɡu/

The digraphs ⟨qu⟩ and ⟨gu⟩, before ⟨e⟩ and ⟨i⟩, may represent both plain or labialised sounds (quebra /ˈkɛbɾɐ/, cinquenta /sĩˈkʷẽtɐ/, guerra /ˈɡɛʁɐ/, sagui /saˈɡʷi/), but they are always labialised before ⟨a⟩ and ⟨o⟩ (quase, quociente, guaraná). The trema used to be employed to explicitly indicate labialized sounds before ⟨e⟩ and ⟨i⟩ (quebra vs. cinqüenta), but since its elimination, such words have to be memorised. Pronunciation divergences mean some of these words may be spelled differently (quatorze / catorze and quotidiano / cotidiano). The digraph ⟨ch⟩ is pronounced as an English ⟨tsh⟩ by the overwhelming majority of speakers. The digraphs ⟨th⟩, ⟨lh⟩, ⟨wh⟩, ⟨sh⟩, ⟨ph⟩, ⟨rh⟩, ⟨zh⟩ and ⟨nh⟩, of Occitan origin, denote palatal consonants that do not exist in English. The digraphs ⟨ng⟩, ⟨rr⟩ and ⟨ss⟩ are used only between vowels. The pronunciation of the digraph ⟨rr⟩ varies with dialect (see the note on the phoneme /ʁ/, above.^{nb 11})

== Diacritics ==
Portuguese makes use of five diacritics: the cedilla (ç), acute accent (á, é, í, ó, ú), circumflex accent (â, ê, ô), tilde (ã, õ), and grave accent (almost abolished in the 1990 Orthography Reform) (à, rarely ò, formerly also è, ì, and ù). Its major use was on adverbial formations: Só->Sòmente, Última->Ùltimamente. Formerly the diaeresis was also used (ï, ü).

Grapheme	Pronunciation
á	a
â	ɐ (ɐ̃)
ã	ɐ̃
à	a
ç	s
é	ɛ
ê	e (ẽ, ɐj)
í	i (ĩ)
ó	ɔ
ô	o (õ)
õ	õ
ú	u (ũ)

The cedilla (◌̧) indicates that ç is pronounced /s/ (from a historic palatalization). By convention, s is written instead of etymological ç at the beginning of words, as in "São", the hypocoristic form of the female name "Conceição".

The acute accent (◌́) and the circumflex accent (◌̂) indicate that a vowel is stressed and the quality of the accented vowel and, more precisely, its height: á, é, and ó are low vowels (except in nasal vowels); â, ê, and ô are high vowels. They also distinguish a few homographs: por "by" with pôr "to put", pode "[he/she/it] can" with pôde "[he/she/it] could".

The tilde (◌̃) marks nasal vowels before glides such as in cãibra and nação, at the end of words, before final -s, and in some compounds: romãzeira "pomegranate tree", from romã "pomegranate", and vãmente "vainly", from vã "vain". It usually coincides with the stressed vowel unless there is an acute or circumflex accent elsewhere in the word or if the word is compound: órgão "organ", irmã + -zinha ("sister" + diminutive suffix) = irmãzinha "little sister". The form õ is used only in the plurals of nouns ending in -ão (nação → nações) and in the second person singular and third person forms of the verb pôr in the present tense (pões, põe, põem).

- The graphemes â, ê, ô and é typically represent oral vowels (e.g.: dâblio, você, pôr, época), but before m or n followed by another consonant (or word final -m in the case of ê and é), the vowels represented are nasal. Elsewhere, nasal vowels are indicated with a tilde (ã, õ).

The grave accent (◌̀) marks the contraction of two consecutive vowels in adjacent words (crasis), normally the preposition a and an article or a demonstrative pronoun: a + aquela = àquela "at that", a + a = à "at the". It can also be used when indicating time: "às 4 horas" = "at 4 o'clock". It does not indicate stress.

- Sometimes à and ò are used in other contraction forms, e.g.: cò(s) and cà(s) (from the comparative conjunction que ‘than’ and definite articles o and a). (Although, these examples are rare and tend to be called unstandard or dialectal, as well as co(s) and coa/ca(s) from com ‘with’ + definite articles). Other examples of its use are: prà, pràs (from para+a/as) and prò, pròs (from para+o/os). According to the orthographic rules of 1990 (adopted only in Portugal, Brazil, and Cabo Verde in 2009), these forms should be spelled without the grave accent.
- Until the spelling reforms of 1971 (Brazil) and 1973 (Portugal), the grave accent was also used to denote accents in words with so-called irregular stress after some changes. Namely adverbs formed with the -mente affix and nouns with affixes that start with z like -zinho or -zão, as well as in some other cases of indication of slightly accented or yet unaccented vowels (mostly because of affixal word formation), all of the vowels can take the grave accent mark, e.g.: provàvelmente, cafèzinho, analìticamente, lògicamente, ùnicamente. The main pattern is to change the acute accent mark, if it graphically exists in any part of the word before the affixation to the grave one, e.g.: in penultimate syllable: notável › notàvelmente; in ultimate syllable: jacaré › jacarèzão, and so on. The circumflex accent mark did not change: simultâneo/a › simultâneamente.
- From 1911 to 1945, exclusively in Portugal and its colonies, the grave accent was also used to distinguish a pair of words that had different pronunciations in their unstressed vowels, like pregar (/pɾɨˈɡaɾ/ "to nail") and prègar (/pɾɛˈɡaɾ/ "to preach"), or molhado (/muˈʎa.du/ "wet") and mòlhado (/mɔˈʎa.du/ - "with sauce"). Although even in its time, this use was rare and restricted to è and ò only. Some grammatists still denote unstressed [ɛ] and [ɔ] as è and ò respectively, but this accentuation is not provided by the current orthographical standards.

The diaeresis (◌̈) is nowadays practically in disuse. Until 2009 they were still used in Brazilian Portuguese in the combinations güe/qüe and güi/qüi (European Portuguese in this case used the grave accent between 1911 and 1945, then abolished). In old orthography they were also used as in English, French and Dutch to separate diphthongs (e.g.: Raïnha, Luïsa, saüde and so on). The other way to separate diphthongs and non-hiatic vowel combinations is to use acute (as in modern saúde) or circumflex (as in pre-1911 common orthography Corôa).

=== Stress ===
Below are the general rules for the use of the acute accent and the circumflex in Portuguese. Primary stress may fall on any of the three final syllables of a word. A word is called oxytone if it is stressed on its last syllable, paroxytone if stress falls on the syllable before the last (the penult), and proparoxytone if stress falls on the third syllable from the end (the antepenult). Most multisyllabic words are stressed on the penult.

All words stressed on the antepenult take an accent mark. Words with two or more syllables, stressed on their last syllable, are not accented if they have any ending other than -a(s), -e(s), -o(s), -am, -em, -ens; except to indicate hiatus as in açaí. With these endings paroxytonic words must then be accented to differentiate them from oxytonic words, as in amável, lápis, órgão.

==== Monosyllables ====
Monosyllables are typically not accented, but those whose last vowel is a, e, or o, possibly followed by final -s, -m or -ns, may require an accent mark.

- The verb pôr is accented to distinguish it from the preposition por.
- Third-person plural forms of the verbs ter and vir, têm and vêm are accented to be distinguished from third-person singulars of the same verbs, tem, vem. Other monosyllables ending in -em are not accented.
- Monosyllables ending in -o(s) with the vowel pronounced /u/ (as in English "do") or in -e(s) with the vowel pronounced /i/ (as in English "be") or /ɨ/ (approximately as in English "roses") are not accented. Otherwise, they are accented.
- Monosyllables containing only the vowel a take an acute accent except for the contractions of the preposition a with the article a(s), which take the grave accent, à(s), and for the following clitic articles, pronouns, prepositions, or contractions, which are not accented (all pronounced with /ɐ/ in Europe): a(s), da(s), la(s), lha(s), ma(s), na(s), ta(s). Most of those words have a masculine equivalent ending in -o(s), also not accented: o(s), do(s), lo(s), lho(s), mo(s), no(s), to(s).

==== Polysyllables ====
- The endings -a(s), -e(s), -o(s), -am, -em, -ens are unstressed. The stressed vowel of words with such endings is assumed to be the first one before the ending itself: bonita, bonitas, gente, viveram, seria, serias (verbs), seriam. If the word happens to be stressed elsewhere, it requires an accent mark: será, serás, até, séria, sérias (adjectives), Inácio, Amazônia/Amazónia. The endings -em and -ens take the acute accent when stressed (contém, convéns), except in third-person plural forms of verbs derived from ter and vir, which take the circumflex (contêm, convêm). Words with other endings are regarded as oxytone by default: viver, jardim, vivi, bambu, pensais, pensei, pensou, pensão. They require an accent when they are stressed on a syllable other than their last: táxi, fácil, amáveis, râguebi.
- Rising diphthongs (which may also be pronounced as hiatuses) containing stressed i or stressed u are accented so they will not be pronounced as falling diphthongs. Exceptions are those whose stressed vowel forms a syllable with a letter other than s. Thus, raízes (syllabified as ra-í-zes), incluído (in-clu-í-do), saía (sa-i-a) and saíste (sa-ís-te) are accented, but raiz (ra-iz), sairmos (sa-ir-mos) and saiu (sa-iu) are not. (There are a few more exceptions, not discussed here.)
- The stressed diphthongs ei, eu, oi take an acute accent on the first vowel whenever it is low.
- Aside from those cases, there are a few more words that take an accent, usually to disambiguate frequent homographs such as pode (present tense of the verb poder, with [ɔ]) and pôde (preterite of the same verb, with [o]). In European Portuguese, a distinction is made in the first person plural of verbs in -ar, between the present tense ending -amos /ˈɐmuʃ/ and the preterite -ámos /ˈamuʃ/. As these are pronounced identically in Brazilian Portuguese, this accent is not used.

Accentuation rules of Portuguese are somewhat different regarding syllabification than those of Spanish (English "continuous" is Portuguese contínuo, Spanish continuo, and English "I continue" is Portuguese continuo, Spanish continúo, in both cases with the same syllable accented in Portuguese and Spanish).

=== Personal names ===
The use of diacritics in personal names is generally restricted to the combinations above, often also by the applicable Portuguese spelling rules.

Portugal is more restrictive than Brazil in regard to given names. They must be Portuguese or adapted to the Portuguese orthography and sound and should also be easily discerned as either a masculine or feminine name by a Portuguese speaker. There are lists of previously accepted and refused names, and names that are both unusual and not included in the list of previously accepted names must be subject to consultation of the national director of registries. The list of previously accepted names includes some of the most common names, like "Pedro" (Peter) and "Ana" (Anne). Brazilian birth registrars, on the other hand, are likely to accept names containing any (Latin) letters or diacritics and are limited only to the availability of such characters in their typesetting facility.

== Consonants with more than one spelling ==
Most consonants have the same values as in the International Phonetic Alphabet, except for the palatals /ʎ/ and /ɲ/, which are spelled ⟨lh⟩ and ⟨nh⟩, respectively, and the following velars, rhotics, and sibilants:

=== Velar plosives ===
Phoneme	Default		Before ⟨e⟩ or ⟨i⟩	
Phoneme	Spelling	Examples	Spelling	Examples
/ɡ/	g	goiano	gu	guerra, guitarra
/ɡʷ/	gu	guano	gu	unguento, sagui
/ɡu/	gu	averigua	gu	Guiana, averigue
/k/	c	colar	qu	quente, aqui
/kʷ/	qu	adequado	qu	cinquenta, aquífero
/ku/	cu	acuado	cu	cueca

=== Rhotics ===
The alveolar flap /ɾ/ is always spelled as a single ⟨r⟩. The other rhotic phoneme of Portuguese, which may be pronounced as a trill [r] or as one of the fricatives [x], [ʁ], or [h], according to the idiolect of the speaker, is either written ⟨rr⟩ or ⟨r⟩, as described below.

Phoneme	Start of syllable		Between vowels		Closed syllable		End of syllable	
Phoneme	Spelling	Examples	Spelling	Examples	Spelling	Examples	Spelling	Examples
/ʁ/	r	rosa, tenro, guelra	rr	carro	r	sorte	r	mar
/ɾ/	-	-	r	caro	r	sorte	r	mar
∅	-	-	-	-	-	-	r	mar

=== Sibilants ===
For the following phonemes, the phrase "at the start of a syllable" can be understood as "at the start of a word, or between a consonant and a vowel, in that order".

Phoneme	Start of syllable (Note: including consonant clusters that belong to a single syllable, like psique)		Between vowels		Closed syllables and end of syllable	
Phoneme	Spelling	Examples	Spelling	Examples	Spelling	Examples
/s/	s (Note: including consonant clusters that belong to a single syllable, as in psique), c (Note: before ⟨e, i⟩)	sapo, psique, cedo	ss, ç, (Note: before ⟨a, o, u⟩. ⟨ç⟩ never starts or ends a word.) c, x (Note: only in a very small number of words derived from Latin, such as trouxe and próximo)	assado, passe, açoite, alperce próximo	s, x, (Note: only in words derived from Latin or Greek, preceded by ⟨e⟩ and followed by one of the voiceless consonants ⟨c, p, s, t⟩) z (Note: only at the end of words and in rare compounds)	isto, externo, paz
/ʃ/	ch, x	chuva, cherne, xarope, xisto	ch, x	fecho, duche, caixa, mexilhão	s, x, z	isto, externo, paz
/z/	z	zumbido, zero	s, z, x (Note: only in a few words derived from Latin or Greek that begin with ⟨ex⟩- or ⟨hex⟩- followed by a vowel, and in compounds made from such words)	rosa, Brasil, prazo, azeite, exemplo	s, x, (Note: only in a few compound words) z	turismo, ex-mulher, felizmente
/ʒ/	j, g	jogo, jipe, gente	j, g	ajuda, pajem, agenda	s, x, z	turismo, ex-mulher, felizmente

Note that there are two main groups of accents in Portuguese, one in which the sibilants are alveolar at the end of syllables (/s/ or /z/), and another in which they are postalveolar (/ʃ/ or /ʒ/). In this position, the sibilants occur in complementary distribution, voiced before voiced consonants, and voiceless before voiceless consonants or at the end of utterances.

== Vowels ==
The vowels in the pairs /a, ɐ/, /e, ɛ/, /o, ɔ/ only contrast in stressed syllables. In unstressed syllables, each element of the pair occurs in complementary distribution with the other. Stressed /ɐ/ appears mostly before the nasal consonants ⟨m⟩, ⟨n⟩, ⟨nh⟩, followed by a vowel, and stressed /a/ appears mostly elsewhere although they have a limited number of minimal pairs in EP.

In Brazilian Portuguese, both nasal and unstressed vowel phonemes that only contrast when stressed tend to a mid height though [a] may be often heard in unstressed position (especially when singing or speaking emphatically). In pre-20th-century European Portuguese, they tended to be raised to [ɐ], [ɨ] and [u]. It still is the case of most Brazilian dialects in which the word elogio may be variously pronounced as [iluˈʒiu], [e̞lo̞ˈʒiu], [e̞luˈʒiu], etc. Some dialects, such as those of Northeastern and Southern Brazil, tend to do less pre-vocalic vowel reduction and in general the unstressed vowel sounds adhere to that of one of the stressed vowel pair, namely [ɛ, ɔ] and [e, o] respectively.

In educated speech, vowel reduction is used less often than in colloquial and vernacular speech though still more than the more distant dialects, and in general, mid vowels are dominant over close-mid ones and especially open-mid ones in unstressed environments when those are in free variation (that is, sozinho is always [sɔˈzĩɲu], even in Portugal, while elogio is almost certainly [e̞lo̞ˈʒi.u]). Mid vowels are also used as choice for stressed nasal vowels in both Portugal and Rio de Janeiro though not in São Paulo and southern Brazil, but in Bahia, Sergipe and neighboring areas, mid nasal vowels supposedly are close-mid like those of French. Veneno can thus vary as EP [vɯ̽ˈne̞nu], RJ [vẽ̞ˈnẽ̞nu], SP [veˈnenʊ] and BA [vɛˈnɛ̃nu] according to the dialect. /ɐ̃/ also has significant variation, as shown in the respective dialect pronunciations of banana as [baˈnə̃nə], [bə̃ˈnə̃nə], and [bəˈnənə].

Vowel reduction of unstressed nasal vowels is extremely pervasive nationwide in Brazil, in vernacular, colloquial and even most educated speech registers. It is slightly more resisted but still present in Portugal.

=== Diacritics ===
The pronunciation of the accented vowels is fairly stable except that they become nasal in certain conditions. See #Nasalization for further information about this regular phenomenon. In other cases, nasal vowels are marked with a tilde.

The grave accent is only used on the letter ⟨a⟩ and is merely grammatical, meaning a crasis between two ⟨a⟩ such as the preposition a "a" and a "the (f.)" (vou a cidade → vou à cidade "I'm going to the city"). In dialects where unstressed ⟨a⟩ represents /ɐ/, ⟨à⟩ represents /a/; in dialects where unstressed ⟨a⟩ is /a/ the grave accent makes no difference in pronunciation.

There was a proposal to use the grave for separation of unstressed diphthongs, e.g.: saìmento, paìsagem, saùdar.

The trema was official prior to the last orthographical reform and can still be found in older texts. It meant that the usually silent ⟨u⟩ between ⟨q⟩ or ⟨g⟩ and ⟨i⟩ or ⟨e⟩ is in fact pronounced: líqüido "liquid" and sangüíneo "related to blood". Some words have two acceptable pronunciations, varying largely by accents.

It was also proposed to use the grave accent instead of trema, e.g.: líqùido, sangùíneo.

Grapheme	Pronunciation
ú	u (ũ)
ó	ɔ
á	a
à	a
é	ɛ
í	i (ĩ)
ô	o (õ)
õ	õ
â	ɐ, ɐ̃
ã	ɐ̃
ê	e, əj

=== Diphthongs ===
The pronunciation of each diphthong is also fairly predictable, but one must know how to distinguish true diphthongs from adjacent vowels in hiatus, which belong to separate syllables. For example, in the word saio /ˈsai.u/ ([ˈsaj.ju]), the ⟨i⟩ forms a clearer diphthong with the previous vowel (but a slight yod also in the next syllable is generally present), but in saiu /sɐˈiu/ ([sɐˈiw]), it forms a diphthong with the next vowel. As in Spanish, a hiatus may be indicated with an acute accent, distinguishing homographs such as saia /ˈsai.ɐ/ ([ˈsaj.jɐ]) and saía /sɐˈi.ɐ/.

Oral
Grapheme	Pronunciation	Grapheme	Pronunciation
ai	[ai]	au	[au]
ei, êi	[ei ~ e(ː)], [əi] (Note: In central Portugal.)	eu, êu	[eu]
oi	[oi]	ou	[ou ~ oː]
ai, ái	[ai]	au, áu	[au]
ei, éi	[ɛi], [əi]	eu, éu	[ɛu]
oi, ói	[ɔi]		
		iu	[iu]
ui	[ui]		
Nasal
Grapheme	Pronunciation	Grapheme	Pronunciation
ãe, ãi	[ɐ̃ĩ]	ão	[ɐ̃ũ]
õe	[õĩ]	-	
ui	ũĩ	-	

=== Nasalization ===
When a syllable ends with ⟨m⟩ or ⟨n⟩, the consonant is not fully pronounced but merely indicates the nasalization of the vowel which precedes it. At the end of words, it generally produces a nasal diphthong.

Monophthongs		Diphthongs	
Grapheme	Pronunciation	Grapheme	Pronunciation
-un, -um, -ún, -úm (Note: at the end of a syllable or word)	/ũ/		
-on, -om, -ôn, -ôm	/õ/		
-an, -am, -ân, -âm (Note: at the end of a syllable)	/ɐ̃/	-am (Note: at the end of a word)	/ɐ̃ũ/
-en, -em, -ên, -êm	/ẽ/	-em, -êm, -ém	/ẽĩ/ ([ɐ̃ĩ])
-en, -em, -ên, -êm	/ẽ/	-en-, -én- (Note: before final ⟨s⟩, for example in the words bens and parabéns)	/ẽĩ/ ([ɐ̃ĩ])
-in, -im, -ín, -ím	/ĩ/		

The letter ⟨m⟩ is conventionally written before ⟨b⟩ or ⟨p⟩ or at the end of words (also in a few compound words such as comummente - comumente in Brazil), and ⟨n⟩ is written before other consonants. In the plural, the ending -⟨m⟩ changes into -⟨ns⟩; for example bem, rim, bom, um → bens, rins, bons, uns. Some loaned words end with -⟨n⟩ (which is usually pronounced in European Portuguese).

Nasalization of ⟨ui⟩, according to modern orthography, is left unmarked in the six words muito, muita, muitos, muitas, mui, ruim (the latter one only in Brazilian Portuguese). During some periods, the nasal ⟨ui⟩ was marked as ⟨ũi⟩: mũi, mũita, mũito, mũitas, mũitos.

The word endings -am, -em, -en(+s), with or without an accent mark on the vowel, represent nasal diphthongs derived from various Latin endings, often la-ant, -unt or -en(t)-. Final -⟨am⟩, which appears in polysyllabic verbs, is always unstressed. The grapheme -⟨en⟩- is also pronounced as a nasal diphthong in a few compound words, such as bendito (bem + dito), homenzinho (homem + zinho), and Benfica.

== Morphological considerations ==
Nouns which end in -⟨gem⟩ often have a corresponding verb whose infinitive ends in -⟨jar⟩; these verbs retain ⟨j⟩ (rather than ⟨g⟩) in their conjugations, even in forms that are pronounced identically to the corresponding noun, e.g. viagem "voyage (noun)" but viajem (third person plural of the present subjunctive of the verb viajar "to travel").

Verbs whose thematic vowel becomes a stressed ⟨i⟩ in one of their inflections are spelled with an ⟨i⟩ in the whole conjugation, as are other words of the same family: crio "I create" implies criar "to create" and criatura "creature".

Verbs whose thematic vowel becomes a stressed ⟨ei⟩ in one of their inflections are spelled with an ⟨e⟩ in the whole conjugation, as are other words of the same family: nomeio "I nominate" implies nomear "to nominate" and nomeação "nomination".

== Etymological considerations ==
The majority of the Portuguese lexicon is derived from Latin, Celtic, Greek, some Germanic and some Arabic. Greek words are Latinized before being incorporated into the language, and many words of Latin or Greek origin have easily recognizable cognates in English and other western European languages and are spelled according to similar principles. For instance, glória "glory", glorioso "glorious", herança "inheritance", real "real/royal". Some general guidelines for spelling are given below:

- ⟨cu⟩ vs. ⟨qu⟩: if ⟨u⟩ is pronounced syllabically, it is written with ⟨c⟩, as in cueca [kuˈɛkɐ] "male underwear", and if it represents a labialized velar plosive, it is written with ⟨q⟩, as in quando [ˈkwɐ̃du] "when".
- ⟨g⟩ vs. ⟨j⟩: etymological ⟨g⟩, if representing a /ʒ/ phoneme, changes into ⟨j⟩ before ⟨a, o, u⟩.
- ⟨h⟩: this letter is silent; it appears for etymology at the start of a word, in a few interjections, and as part of the digraphs ⟨ch⟩, ⟨lh⟩, ⟨nh⟩. Latin or Greek ⟨ch⟩, ⟨ph⟩, ⟨rh⟩, ⟨th⟩, and ⟨y⟩ are usually converted into ⟨c/qu⟩, ⟨f⟩, ⟨r⟩, ⟨t⟩, and ⟨i⟩, respectively.
- ⟨o⟩ vs. ⟨ou⟩: in many words, the variant ⟨ou⟩ normally corresponds to Latin and Arabic ⟨au⟩ or ⟨al⟩, more rarely to Latin ⟨ap⟩, ⟨oc⟩.
- ⟨s⟩/⟨ss⟩ vs. ⟨c⟩/⟨ç⟩: the letter ⟨s⟩ and the digraph ⟨ss⟩ correspond to Latin ⟨s⟩, ⟨as⟩, or ⟨ns⟩, and to Spanish ⟨s⟩. The graphemes ⟨c⟩ (before ⟨e, i⟩) and ⟨ç⟩ (before ⟨a, o, u⟩) are usually derived from Latin ⟨c⟩ or ⟨t(i)⟩, or from ⟨s⟩ in non-European languages, such as Arabic and Amerindian languages. They often correspond to Spanish ⟨z⟩ in any position or ⟨c⟩ preceding ⟨i⟩ or ⟨e⟩. At the beginning of words, however, ⟨s⟩ is written instead of etymological ⟨ç⟩, by convention.
- ⟨z⟩ vs. ⟨s⟩ between vowels: the letter ⟨z⟩ corresponds to Latin ⟨c⟩ (+ ⟨e⟩, ⟨i⟩) or ⟨t(i)⟩, to Greek or Arabic ⟨z⟩. Intervocalic ⟨s⟩ corresponds to Latin ⟨s⟩.
- ⟨x⟩ vs. ⟨ch⟩: the letter ⟨x⟩ derives from Latin ⟨x⟩ or ⟨s⟩, or from Arabic ⟨dh⟩ and usually corresponds to Spanish ⟨j⟩. The digraph ⟨ch⟩ (before vowels) derives from Latin ⟨cl⟩, ⟨fl⟩, ⟨pl⟩ or from French ⟨ch⟩ and corresponds to Spanish ⟨ll⟩ (like in Rioplatense Spanish) or ⟨ch⟩ (like some varieties of Spanish).
- ⟨s⟩ vs. ⟨x⟩ vs. ⟨z⟩ at the end of syllables: ⟨s⟩ is the most common spelling for all sibilants. The letter ⟨x⟩ appears, preceded by ⟨e⟩ and followed by one of the voiceless consonants ⟨c, p, s, t⟩, in some words derived from Latin or Greek. The letter ⟨z⟩ occurs only at the end of oxytone words and in compounds derived from them, corresponding to Latin ⟨x⟩, ⟨c⟩ (+ ⟨e⟩, ⟨i⟩) or to Arabic ⟨z⟩.

Loanwords with a /ʃ/ in their original languages receive the letter ⟨x⟩ to represent it when they are nativised: xampu "shampoo". While many dialects merged the pronunciations of ⟨ch⟩ and ⟨x⟩ long ago, some Galician-Portuguese dialects like Uruguayan Portuguese and the speech registers of northeastern Portugal and Galicia still preserve the difference as ⟨ch⟩ /tʃ/ vs. ⟨x⟩ /ʃ/, as do other Iberian languages. When one wants to stress the sound difference in dialects in which it merged the convention is to use ⟨tch⟩: tchau "ciao" and República Tcheca "Czech Republic". In most loanwords, it merges with /ʃ/ (or /t/: moti "mochi"), just as [dʒ] most often merges with /ʒ/. Alveolar affricates [ts] and [dz], though, are more likely to be preserved (pizza, Zeitgeist, tsunami, kudzu, adzuki, etc.), although not all of these hold up across some dialects (/zaitʃiˈgaiʃtʃi/ for 'Zeitgeist, /tʃisuˈnɐ̃mi/ for tsunami and /aˈzuki/ for adzuki [along with spelling azuki])

== Syllabification and collation ==
Portuguese syllabification rules require a syllable break between double letters: ⟨cc⟩, ⟨cç⟩, ⟨mm⟩, ⟨nn⟩, ⟨rr⟩, ⟨ss⟩, or other combinations of letters that may be pronounced as a single sound: fric-ci-o-nar, pro-ces-so, car-ro, ex-ce(p)-to, ex-su-dar. Only the digraphs ⟨ch⟩, ⟨lh⟩, ⟨nh⟩, ⟨gu⟩, ⟨qu⟩ are indivisible. All digraphs are however broken down into their constituent letters for the purposes of collation, spelling aloud, and in crossword puzzles.

== Other symbols ==
=== Apostrophe ===
The apostrophe (') appears as part of certain phrases, usually to indicate the elision of a vowel in the contraction of a preposition with the word that follows it: de + água = d'água. It is used almost exclusively in poetry.

=== Hyphen ===
The hyphen (-) is used to make compound words, especially plants and animal names like papagaio-de-rabo-vermelho "red-tailed parrot".

It is also extensively used to append clitic pronouns to the verb, as in quero-o "I want it" (enclisis), or even to embed them within the verb (mesoclisis), as in levaria + vos + os = levar-vo-los-ia "I would take them to you". Proclitic pronouns are not connected graphically to the verb: não o quero "I do not want it". Each element in such compounds is treated as an individual word for accentuation purposes: matarias + o = matá-lo-ias "You would kill it/him", beberá + a = bebê-la-á "He/she will drink it".

=== Quotation marks ===
In European Portuguese, as in many other European languages, angular quotation marks are used for general quotations in literature:

«Isto é um exemplo de como fazer uma citação em português europeu.»
“This is an example of how to make a quotation in European Portuguese.”

Although American-style (“…”) or British-style (‘…’) quotation marks are sometimes used as well, especially in less formal types of writing (they are more easily produced in keyboards) or inside nested quotations, they are less common in careful writing. In Brazilian Portuguese, only American and British-style quote marks are used.

“Isto é um exemplo de como fazer uma citação em português brasileiro.”
“This is an example of how to make a quotation in Brazilian Portuguese.”

In both varieties of the language, dashes are normally used for direct speech rather than quotation marks:

― Aborreço-me tanto ― disse ela.
― Não tenho culpa disso ― retorquiu ele.
“I’m so bored,” she said.
“That’s not my fault,” he shot back.

== Brazilian vs. European spelling ==
Prior to the Portuguese Language Orthographic Agreement of 1990, Portuguese had two orthographic standards:

- The Brazilian orthography, official in Brazil.
- The European orthography, official in Portugal, Macau, (Note: The official spelling of the Portuguese language in Macau is fixed by Decree-Law No. 103/99/M) Timor-Leste and the six African Lusophone countries (Angola, Mozambique, Guinea-Bissau, Equatorial Guinea, São Tomé and Príncipe, and Cape Verde).

The table to the right illustrates typical differences between the two orthographies. Some are due to different pronunciations, but others are merely graphic. The main ones are:

- Presence or absence of certain consonants: The letters ⟨c⟩ and ⟨p⟩ appear in some words before ⟨c⟩, ⟨ç⟩ or ⟨t⟩ in one orthography, but are absent from the other. Normally, the letter is written down in the European spelling, but not in the Brazilian spelling.
- Different use of diacritics: the Brazilian spelling has ⟨a⟩, ⟨ê⟩ or ⟨ô⟩ followed by ⟨m⟩ or ⟨n⟩ before a vowel, in several words where the European orthography has ⟨á⟩, ⟨é⟩ or ⟨ó⟩, due to different pronunciation.
- Different usage of double letters: also due to different pronunciation, Brazilian spelling has only ⟨cc⟩, ⟨rr⟩ and ⟨ss⟩ as double letters. So, Portuguese connosco becomes Brazilian conosco and words ended in ⟨m⟩ with suffix -mente added, (like ruimmente and comummente) become ruimente and comumente in Brazilian spelling.

As of 2016, the reformed orthography under the 1990 agreement is obligatory in Brazil, Cape Verde, and Portugal, but most adult people do not use it.

Written varieties
Convention	Portuguese-speaking countries except Brazil before the 1990 agreement	Brazil before the 1990 agreement	All countries after the 1990 agreement	translation
Different pronunciation	anónimo	anônimo	Both forms remain	anonymous
Different pronunciation	Vénus	Vênus	Both forms remain	Venus
Different pronunciation	facto	fato	Both forms remain	fact
Different pronunciation	ideia	idéia	ideia	idea
Silent consonants	acção	ação	ação	action
Silent consonants	direcção	direção	direção	direction
Silent consonants	eléctrico	elétrico	elétrico	electric
Silent consonants	óptimo	ótimo	ótimo	optimal
Diacritics	pinguim	pingüim	pinguim	penguin
Diacritics	voo	vôo	voo	flight
Non-personal and non-geographical names	Janeiro	janeiro	janeiro	January

== See also ==
- Academia Brasileira de Letras
- Differences between Spanish and Portuguese
- Portuguese names
- Portuguese phonology
- Spelling reforms of Portuguese
- The Vietnamese orthography, partly based on the orthography of Portuguese, through the work of 16th-century Catholic missionaries.
- Acordo Ortográfico de 1990
- 1943 Portuguese Orthographic Form
- Wikipedia in Portuguese: Ortografia da língua portuguesa
- Help:IPA/Portuguese
