= António Garcia Ribeiro de Vasconcelos =

Portuguese theologian and historian (1860–1941)

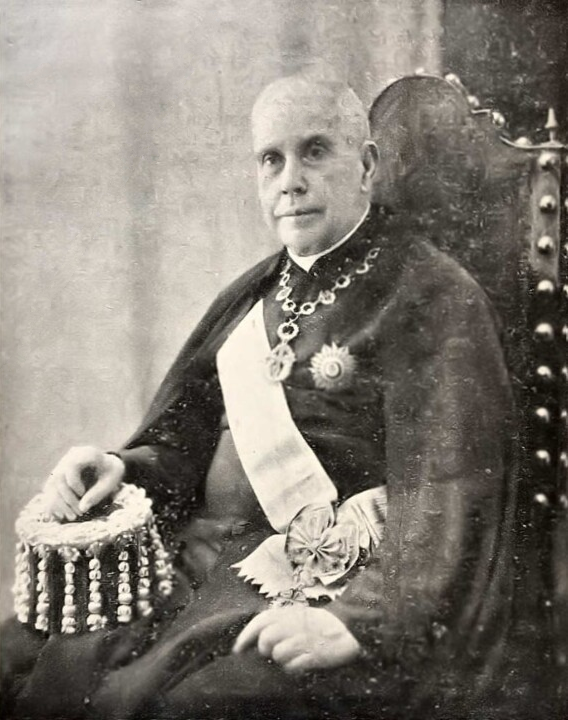
- Born: 1860; Oliveira do Hospital, Portugal
- Died: 1941 (aged 80–81); Coimbra, Portugal
- Occupation: Academic
- Years active: 50

António Garcia Ribeiro de Vasconcelos (1860 – 1941) was a Portuguese historian and theologian. He taught at the University of Coimbra from 1887 to 1930, first in the Faculty of Theology and then in the Faculty of Letters, which appointed him Emeritus Professor. In 1936 he became the first president of the Portuguese Academy of History.

== Early life ==
António Garcia Ribeiro de Vasconcelos was born on 1 June 1860 to Maria José Cândida Coelho Freire de Faria da Cunha e Vasconcelos (1825-1865) and Serafim Garcia Ribeiro (1823-1912) in the village of S. Paio de Gramaços in Oliveira do Hospital, a municipality near Coimbra in Portugal. His father was a landowner and farmer. His mother died when he was five years old. After her death, his father's elder brother, a Catholic priest, joined his brother in S. Paio de Gramaços. When Vasconcelos was 8 or 9 his uncle applied to move to the parish church of São Martinho do Bispo nearer Coimbra. Vasconcelos went with him, and was thus able to go to school in Coimbra. He left High School with awards in distinction in Geography and Natural History and then took preparatory courses in Philosophy and Theology before joining the University of Coimbra in 1879. He did not complete his first year at the university because of contracting typhoid fever, but in 1885 he graduated with a mark of 17 out of 20, having received the First Prize for his class in each of his final three years. As a theology graduate, he was able to celebrate Mass, which he did for the first time in the same year. In 1886 he was awarded a doctorate with a mark of 18 out of 20, with a dissertation on the subject of divorce.

== Academic career ==
In 1887 Vasconcelos became a professor in the Faculty of Theology. In this capacity he taught various courses, including Dogmatic Theology and General Isagogics and Archaeology, Hermeneutics and Heuristics.Vasconcelos was the organizer of the University Archive from 1897 on. He played an important role in setting up the Faculty of Letters at the University of Coimbra and became its first Dean in 1911, after the Faculty of Theology was closed for lack of students. For several years he was director of the University Chapel, about which he wrote a book, using his position to protect many of the chapel's religious objects during the disturbances in Portugal after the 5 October 1910 revolution. He wrote for various magazines and newspapers, particularly for the Correio de Coimbra, the diocese’s paper, and O Instituto, of which he was a member of the editorial board. As a researcher he was known for his meticulousness and obsessive eye for detail, strengths that he passed on to his students. His research was mainly confined to Coimbra and its university, effectively developing the concept of local history in Portugal, but he also wrote biographies, being best known for those on the Portuguese soldier and poet, Brás Garcia de Mascarenhas and the Spanish philosopher Francisco Suárez. He was also well known for his 2-volume work on the Evolution of the Cult of Elizabeth of Aragon.

Vasconcelos was a member of the Lisbon Academy of Sciences from 1897, the Royal Academy of History in Madrid and the founding president of the Portuguese Academy of History. To honour his scientific, literary and artistic merit, the Portuguese government awarded him the Grand Cross of the Military Order of Saint James of the Sword (Portuguese: Ordem Militar de Sant'Iago da Espada) in 1936.

António Vasconcelos died in Coimbra on 2 September 1941.
