= Aniceto dos Reis Gonçalves Viana =

Portuguese writer (1840–1914)

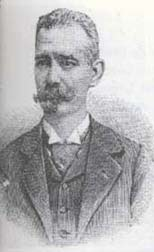
- Born: 6 January 1840; Lisbon, Portugal
- Died: 13 September 1914 (aged 74); Portugal
- Occupations: Writer and orientalist
- Known for: Reorganised the spelling of Portuguese

Aniceto dos Reis Gonçalves Viana (Portuguese pronunciation: [ɐniˈsɛtu ðuʒ ˈʁɐjʒ ɣõˈsalvɨʒ viˈɐnɐ]; 1840–1914) was a Portuguese writer and orientalist, who led a committee that made reforms of Portuguese orthography to make it more phonetic.

== Biography ==
Aniceto dos Reis Gonçalves Viana was born in Lisbon in 1840. His father, who was an actor, and his brother died of yellow fever in 1857. Viana had to concentrate on earning money to support his family.

He continued his studies, first studying Greek and then Sanskrit under Guilherme de Vasconcelos Abreu.

He led the commission that advised on how the spelling of Portuguese should be reformed. This change was successfully made, but created a schism with Brazil which continued to use the traditional spelling.

== Selected works ==
- 1897; Selecta Easy English Readings
- 1897; Grammar English
- 1907; French Grammar
