= List of freguesias of Portugal: T =

The freguesias (civil parishes) of Portugal are listed in by municipality according to the following format:

- concelho
  - freguesias

== Tábua ==
- Ázere
- Candosa
- Carapinha
- Covas
- Covelo
- Espariz
- Meda de Mouros
- Midões
- Mouronho
- Pinheiro de Coja
- Póvoa de Midões
- São João da Boa Vista
- Sinde
- Tábua
- Vila Nova de Oliveirinha

== Tabuaço ==
- Adorigo
- Arcos
- Barcos
- Chavães
- Desejosa
- Granja do Tedo
- Granjinha
- Longra
- Paradela
- Pereiro
- Pinheiros
- Santa Leocádia
- Sendim
- Tabuaço
- Távora
- Vale de Figueira
- Valença do Douro

== Tarouca ==
- Dálvares
- Gouviães
- Granja Nova
- Mondim da Beira
- Salzedas
- São João de Tarouca
- Tarouca
- Ucanha
- Várzea da Serra
- Vila Chã da Beira

== Tavira ==
- Cabanas de Tavira
- Cachopo
- Conceição
- Luz de Tavira
- Santa Catarina da Fonte do Bispo
- Santa Luzia
- Santo Estêvão
- Santa Maria
- Santiago

== Terras de Bouro ==
- Balança
- Brufe
- Campo do Gerês
- Carvalheira
- Chamoim
- Chorense
- Cibões
- Covide
- Gondoriz
- Moimenta
- Monte
- Ribeira
- Rio Caldo
- Souto
- Valdosende
- Vilar
- Vilar da Veiga

== Tomar ==
- Além da Ribeira
- Alviobeira
- Asseiceira
- Beselga
- Carregueiros
- Casais
- Junceira
- Madalena
- Olalhas
- Paialvo
- Pedreira
- Sabacheira
- Santa Maria dos Olivais (Tomar)
- São Pedro de Tomar
- Serra
- Tomar (São João Baptista)

== Tondela ==
- Barreiro de Besteiros
- Campo de Besteiros
- Canas de Santa Maria
- Caparrosa
- Castelões
- Dardavaz
- Ferreirós do Dão
- Guardão
- Lajeosa
- Lobão da Beira
- Molelos
- Mosteirinho
- Mosteiro de Fráguas
- Mouraz
- Nandufe
- Parada de Gonta
- Sabugosa
- Santiago de Besteiros
- São João do Monte
- São Miguel do Outeiro
- Silvares
- Tonda
- Tondela
- Tourigo
- Vila Nova da Rainha
- Vilar de Besteiros

== Torre de Moncorvo ==
- Açoreira
- Adeganha
- Cabeça Boa
- Cardanha
- Carviçais
- Castedo
- Felgar
- Felgueiras
- Horta da Vilariça
- Larinho
- Lousa
- Maçores
- Mós
- Peredo dos Castelhanos
- Souto da Velha
- Torre de Moncorvo
- Urrós
- Urrós e Peredo dos Castelhanos

== Torres Novas ==
- Alcorochel
- Assentiz
- Brogueira
- Chancelaria
- Lapas
- Meia Via
- Olaia
- Paço
- Parceiros de Igreja
- Pedrógão
- Riachos
- Ribeira Branca
- Torres Novas (Salvador)
- Torres Novas (Santa Maria)
- Torres Novas (Santiago)
- Torres Novas (São Pedro)
- Zibreira

== Torres Vedras ==
- A dos Cunhados
- Campelos
- Carmões
- Carvoeira
- Dois Portos
- Freiria
- Maceira
- Matacães
- Maxial
- Monte Redondo
- Outeiro da Cabeça
- Ponte do Rol
- Ramalhal
- Runa
- São Pedro da Cadeira
- Silveira
- Torres Vedras (Santa Maria do Castelo e São Miguel)
- Torres Vedras (São Pedro e Santiago)
- Turcifal
- Ventosa

== Trancoso ==
- Aldeia Nova
- Carnicães
- Castanheira
- Cogula
- Cótimos
- Feital
- Fiães
- Freches
- Granja
- Guilheiro
- Moimentinha
- Moreira de Rei
- Palhais
- Póvoa do Concelho
- Reboleiro
- Rio de Mel
- Sebadelhe da Serra
- Souto Maior
- Tamanhos
- Terrenho
- Torre do Terrenho
- Torres
- Trancoso (Santa Maria)
- Trancoso (São Pedro)
- Valdujo
- Vale do Seixo
- Vila Franca das Naves
- Vila Garcia
- Vilares

== Trofa ==
- Alvarelhos
- Bougado (Santiago)
- Bougado (São Martinho)
- Coronado (São Mamede)
- Coronado (São Romão)
- Covelas
- Guidões
- Muro
