= Tavira (disambiguation) =

Tavira is a town and a municipality in southern Portugal.

Taviara may also refer to:

- Tavira (Santa Maria e Santiago), a civil parish in Tavira, Portugal
- Tavira DOC, a wine region centered around Tavira, Portugal
- Tavira Island, an island south of Tavira, Portugal
- Durango, Biscay, Spain, formerly Tavira

== See also ==
- Tabira (disambiguation)
