= Mondim =

Mondim may refer to the following places in Portugal:

- Mondim da Beira, civil parish in the municipality of Tarouca
- Mondim de Basto, municipality in the district of Vila Real
