= Carlo Gimach =

Maltese architect, engineer and poet (1651–1730)

- Born: 2 March 1651; Hospitaller Malta
- Died: 31 December 1730 (aged 79); Rome, Papal States
- Resting place: Basilica of St Anastasia; 41°53′17.1″N 12°29′3.1″E
- Education: Roman College
- Occupations: Architect and engineer
- Parents: Gio Paolo Gimach (father); Paolina Sartre (mother)

Carlo Gimach (2 March 1651 – 31 December 1730) was a Maltese architect, engineer and poet who was active in the late 17th and early 18th centuries. Throughout his career, he worked in Malta, Portugal, and Rome, and he is mostly known for designing Palazzo Carneiro (now Auberge de Bavière) in Valletta, renovating the Monastery of Arouca in Portugal, and restoring the Basilica of St. Anastasia in Rome. He is known to have written a number of poems and other literary works, but these are all lost with the exception of one cantata which he wrote in 1714.

== Life ==
Carlo Gimach was born in 1651 to Gio Paolo Gimach and his wife Paolina Sartre. Gio Paolo Gimach, Carlo Gimach's father, was the merchant son of a Palestinian refugee and was raised by Giovanni Paolo Lascaris. His mother was the daughter of a French migrant and a Maltese noblewoman. He was the third of six children. Gimach's grandfather, the Palestinian refugee, was raised as a Muslim Emir but converted to Christianity after he was made a slave by the Order of Malta. He was eventually freed and went on to provide an average life for his family.

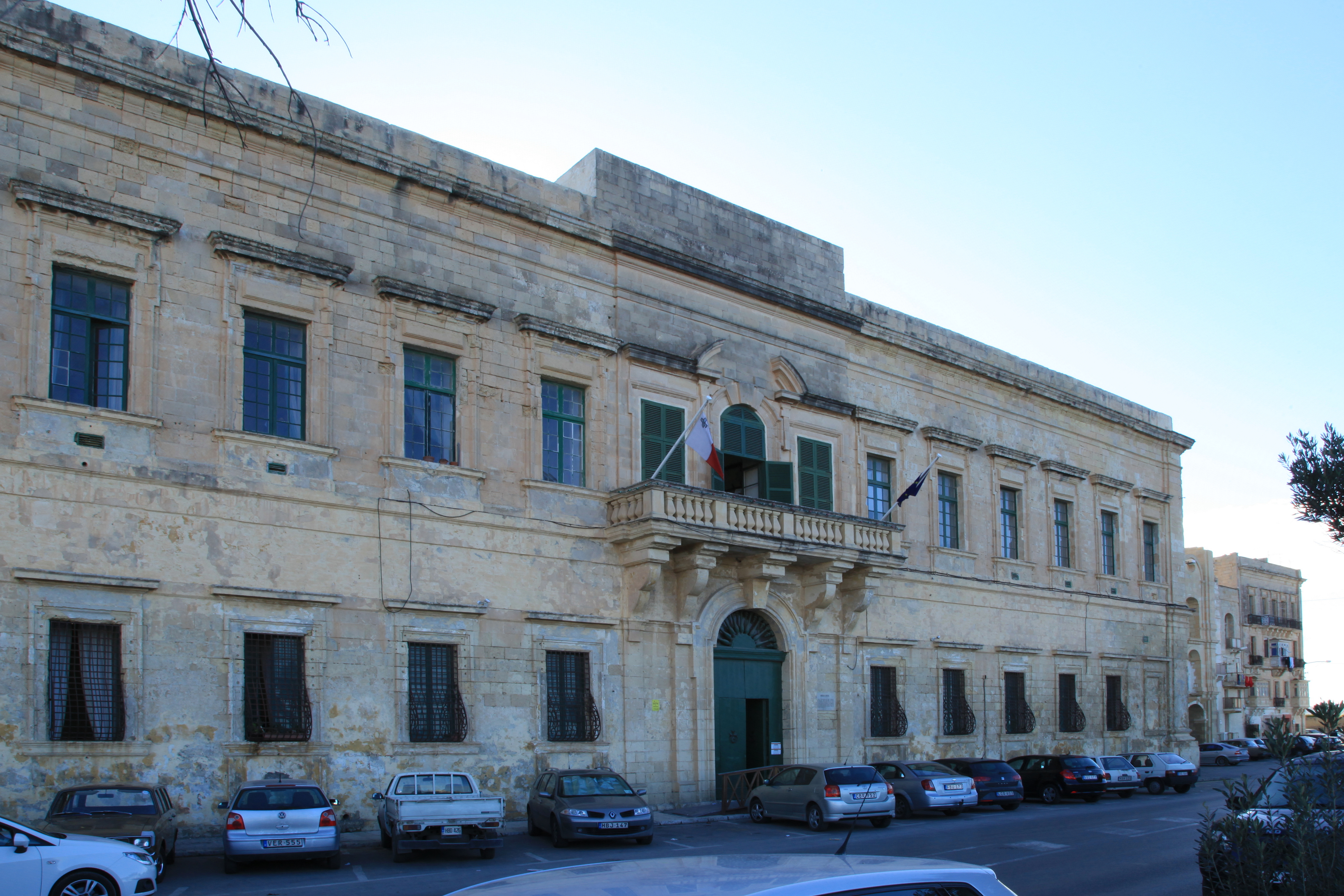
View of Palazzo Carneiro in Valletta, which was designed by Gimach in 1696

Gimach studied in the Roman College in the 1670s before returning to his hometown Valletta, where he was renowned for his knowledge in architecture and literature. He designed two large palaces in the city – Palazzo Correa in 1689, and Palazzo Carneiro in 1696. Palazzo Correa was destroyed in 1942, but Palazzo Carneiro still stands, now known as Auberge de Bavière. Gimach also designed a small shipyard in an area of Valletta known as il-Fossa.

Carlo Gimach married Sebastiana De Sousa Queirós, from this marriage his only son Leandro Gemaque de Albuquerque was born in 1680, in Amarante, Portugal. Gimach went to Portugal in 1696, where he designed a fortified palace in Beira Province for his friend, the knight Fra Antonio Correia de Sousa Montenegro. The palace was never completed due to Correia de Sousa's death, and it was in ruins by the end of the 18th century. Gimach subsequently worked for the House of Arronches and later the Counts of St. John, both in Lisbon and near the border with Spain. In around 1706, he was involved in the reconstruction of various abandoned forts near the border.

In 1707, Gimach was introduced to King John V of Portugal by Rodrigo Anes de Sá Almeida e Meneses, the Marquis of Fontes, with whom he was working at the time. A year later, he designed a triumphal arch in front of the Lisbon Cathedral, which was commissioned by the British to commemorate the marriage of John V and Maria Anna of Austria.

Gimach was subsequently involved in John V's building projects around Portugal, and he renovated the Monastery of St. Mary in Salzedas and the Monastery of the Cistercians in Arouca. The latter is his best-known work in Portugal.

After the Marquis of Fontes was sent to Rome as the Portuguese ambassador in 1712, Gimach went with him as his artistic advisor, where he lived in quarters within Palazzo Spada. In 1718, Gimach became a knight of the Order of Christ in recognition of his services to the Portuguese crown.

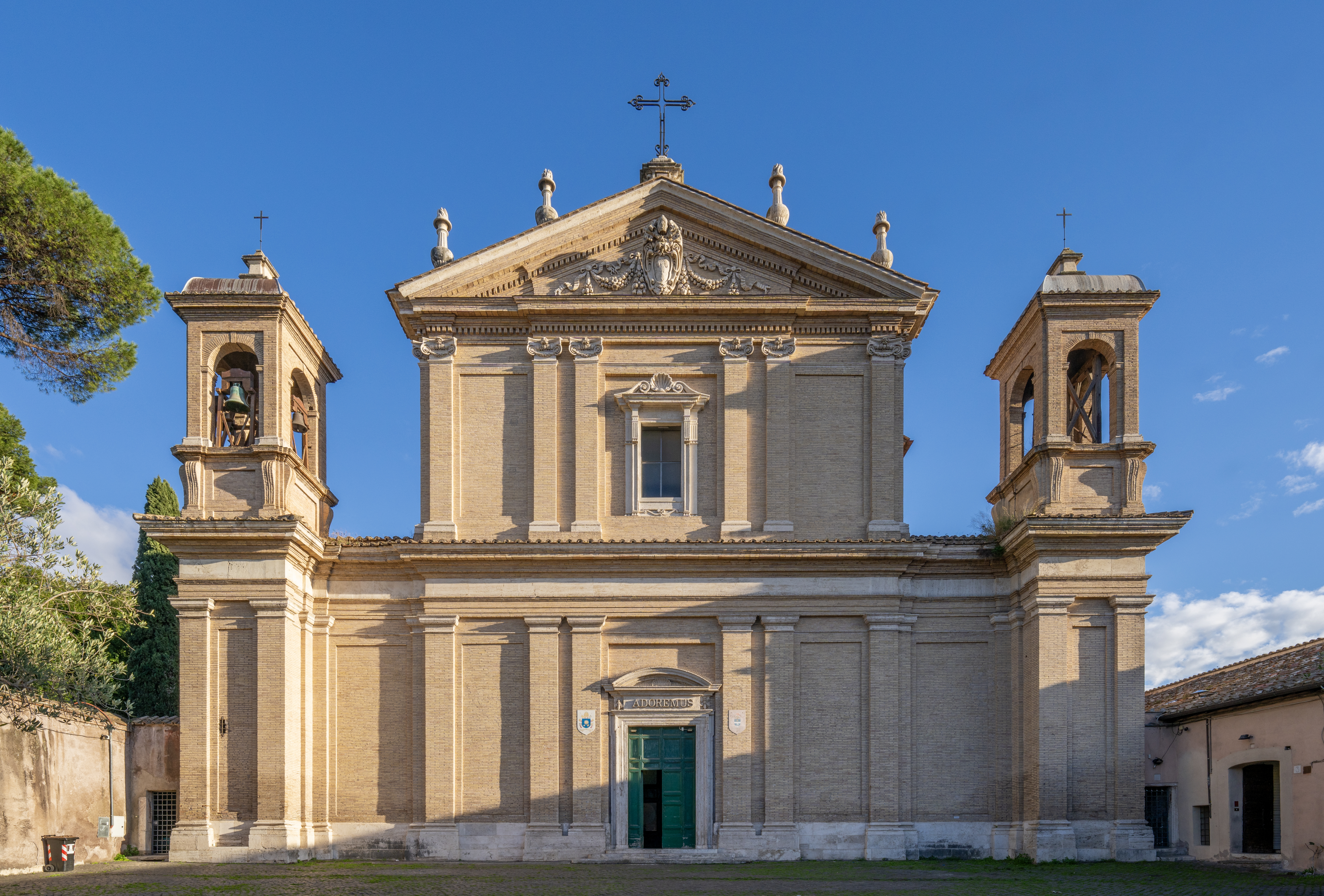
Gimach is buried in the Basilica of St Anastasia, which he had restored in 1721–22.

In 1721, Gimach was commissioned by Nuno da Cunha e Ataíde to restore the Basilica of St Anastasia in Rome, and he built the Chapel of Saint George and Saint Publius within the basilica at his own expense. He died on 31 December 1730 in Rome, and was buried in this chapel.

Gimach is sometimes erroneously described as also having been a painter, but this is due to confusion with Carlo Zimech, a priest and painter from Żebbuġ.

== Literary work ==
Gimach was regarded as a man of considerable talent in Latin and Italian literature. Count Giovanni Antonio Ciantar, one of Gimach's friends, wrote the following about him in the 1772 book Malta Illustrata:

"he wrote various poems, mostly in Italian, some of which he used to read to us; his style is limpid; it is sometimes satirical, but always harmless"

Today, most of Gimach's literary work is believed to be lost, with the exception of the cantata Applauso Genetliaco, which he wrote in 1714. Only two copies of this work are known to exist.

== Works ==
Buildings designed or remodelled by Gimach include:

- Palazzo Correa, Valletta, Malta (1689)
- Renovation of Palazzo Tabria and improvements to the surrounding estate, Ħal Far, Malta (1691–92)
- Palazzo Carneiro, Valletta, Malta (1696)
- Shipyard at Il-Fossa, Valletta, Malta (c. 1696)
- Palace of Fra Antonio Correia de Sousa Montenegro, Beira Province, Portugal (1696) – never completed
- Completion and renovation of the Bishop's Palace and the Convent of Santa Catarina da Ribeira, Lisbon, Portugal
- Reconstruction of fortifications on the Portugal–Spain border (c. 1706)
- Triumphal arch in front of the Lisbon Cathedral (1708)
- Renovation of the Monastery of St. Mary, Salzedas, Portugal
- Renovation of the Monastery of Arouca, Arouca, Portugal
- Restoration of the Basilica of St Anastasia, Rome (1721–22)
- Renovation of Palazzo Malta, Rome (1720s)
