= Auberge de Bavière =

- Berġa tal-Baviera
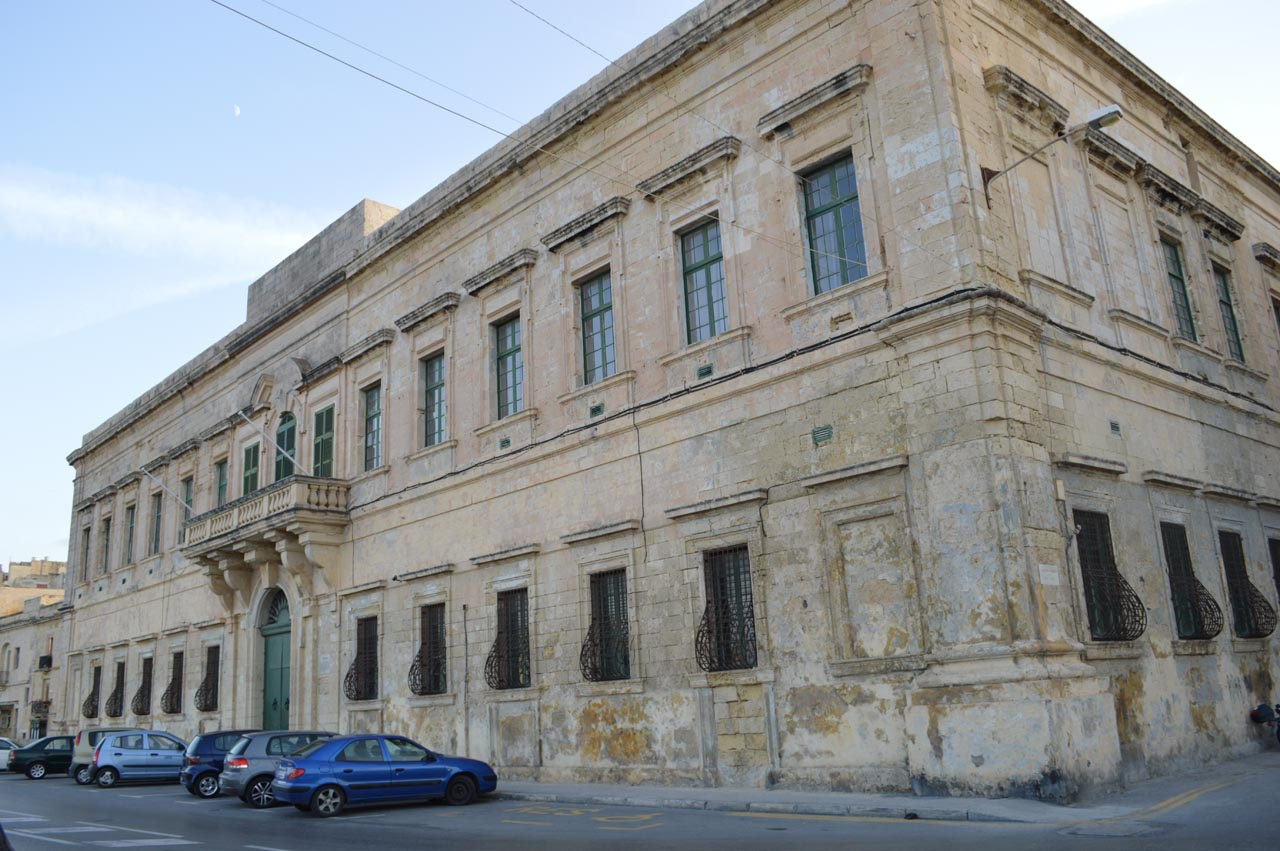
- View of Auberge de Bavière
- Interactive map of the Auberge de Bavière area
- Former names: Palazzo Carneiro; Palazzo Carniero; Carnera Palace; Auberge de Baverie

General information
- Status: Intact
- Type: Palace
- Architectural style: Mannerism
- Location: Valletta, Malta
- Coordinates: 35°54′5.5″N 14°30′51.1″E
- Current tenants: Lands Authority
- Completed: 1696
- Client: Gaspare Carneiro
- Owner: Government of Malta

Technical details
- Material: Limestone
- Floor count: 2

Design and construction
- Architect: Carlo Gimach

The Auberge de Bavière (Maltese: il-Berġa tal-Baviera) is a palace in Valletta, Malta. It was built as Palazzo Carneiro (Maltese: il-Palazz ta' Karnirju) in 1696, and was the residence of Grand Master Marc'Antonio Zondadari in the early 18th century. In 1784, it was converted into the auberge for the Anglo-Bavarian langue of the Order of Saint John, and remained so until the French occupation of Malta in 1798.

It was used by the British military in the 19th and early 20th centuries, briefly housing a military hospital in World War I. It was subsequently used as a school, a hostel for bombed-out people in World War II, and was also used by a number of government agencies. It currently houses the Maltese Lands Authority.

The palace is located in the northern part of Valletta, near the English Curtain and the Jews' Sally Port. It overlooks St. Elmo Bay and the entrance of Marsamxett Harbour. The surrounding neighbourhood is popularly known as il-Baviera after the auberge.

== History ==
=== Palazzo Carneiro ===
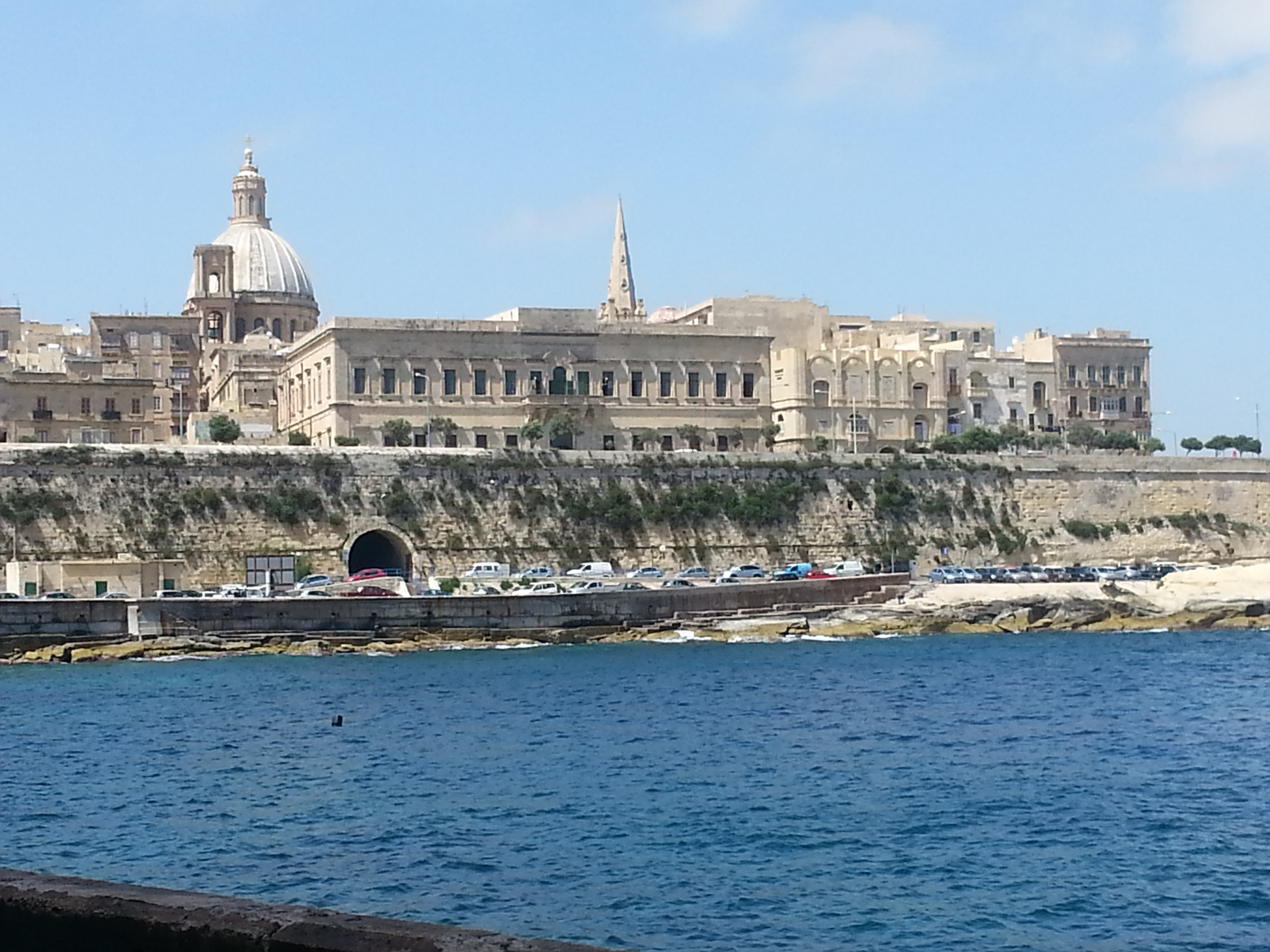
Auberge de Bavière overlooking the English Curtain and the Jews' Sally Port

The Portuguese Balì Fra Gaspare Carneiro had bought the site in 1693 against a payment to the Treasury of the Order. Palazzo Carneiro was built in 1696, by Fra Carneiro, on a site where a lime kiln had stood. The building was designed by the Maltese architect Carlo Gimach, who was a personal friend of Carneiro. The building was one of the last examples of austere and staid architecture in the 17th century, before the much more ornate Baroque style became more popular.

The site was rented for 31 scudi per year for the term of his life and that of one other person nominated by him, and thereafter reverted to the common treasury. Carneiro also owned the country residence Palazzo or Villa Blacas, now found in Hamrun. After the death of Carneiro, the building in Valletta remained known for himself as Palazzo Carneiro. He left the building to the Order after his death.

The palace was the residence of Grand Master Marc'Antonio Zondadari from 1702 until his death in 1722. It was for some time rented out to different distinguished people. In 1725 Grand Master de Vilhena was symbolically given a sword and a hat, known officially as 'stoc' and 'piliet', similar to other heads of European powers by Pope Benedict XIII. For this occasion on 19 April 1725 the papacy sent its Papal Legate, Monsignior Giovanni Francesco Abbate Olivieri. The Grand Master made large ceremonies for this occasion, and embellished Palazzo Carneiro with the finest settings to receive the Papal Legate.

=== Auberge de Bavière ===
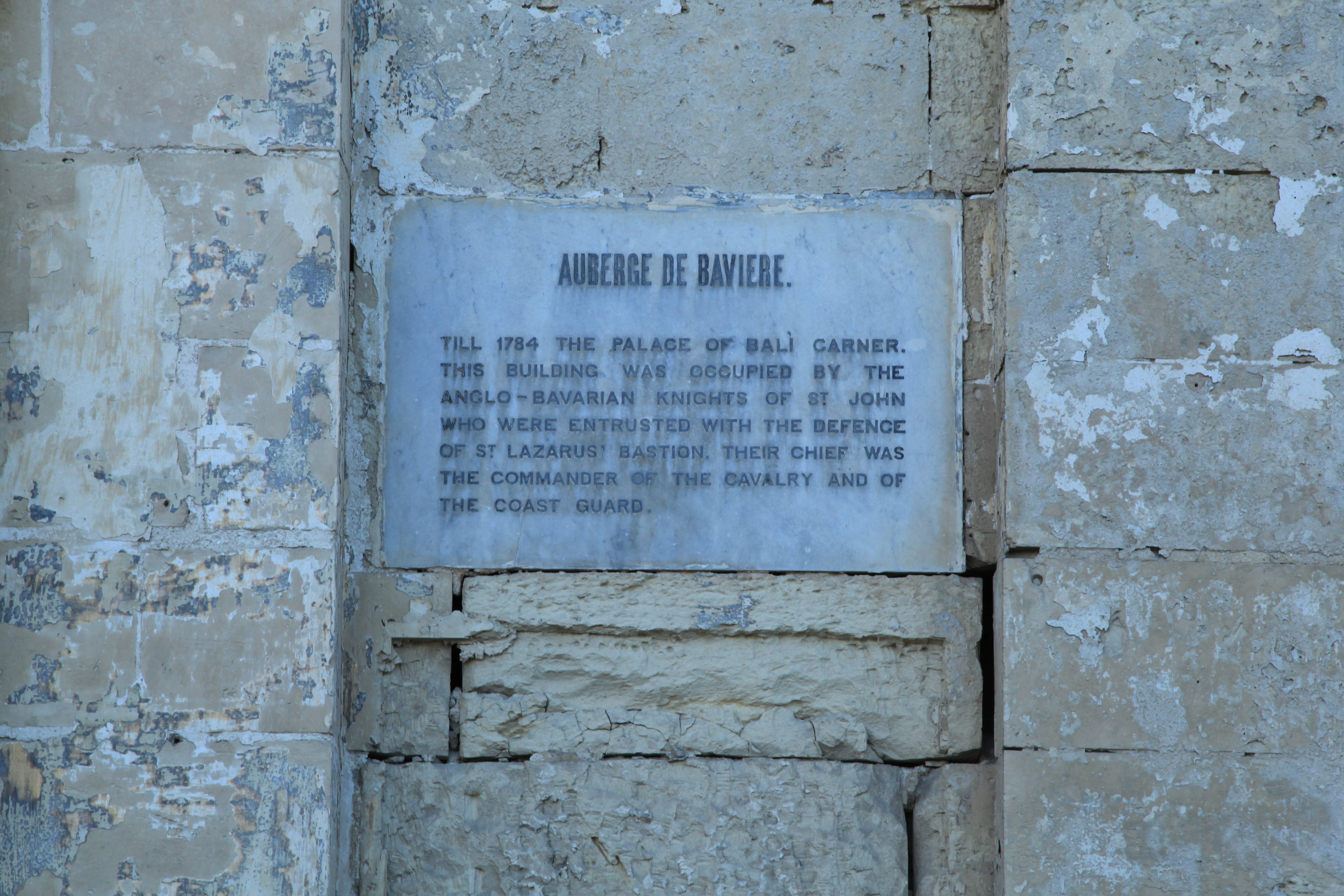
Plaque on the auberge

With mutual understanding, Charles Theodore, Elector of Bavaria persuaded Britain's George III to set up a joint Langue of the Order of St John. In December 1782 the Elector of Bavaria, through Gaetano Bruno, bought the palazzo for 20,000 scudi and it began to be used by the newly formed Anglo-Bavarian Langue which was instituted by Grand Master Emmanuel de Rohan-Polduc two years later in 1784. It was then officially known as Albergo de Bavari or the variants.

Richard Colt Hoare visited the island in the period when the Langue was set up. He names the building as Carnera Palace and has called the union of Bavaria and England as an illusion. Most knights of the Langue were Bavarians who did not want to form part of the continuous existing German Langue. Though an agreement was reached to form a Langue with England, very few interested Englishmen were found to join the Order. The Langue was given responsibility to safeguard the Bastian of St Lazarus, close to the English Curtain.

Other than an auberge for German knights, the building became used for a secret society of the Freemasons composed of multiple European nationalities, including French knights, known as the St John of Secrecy and Harmony Lodge. A notable visit to the building took place in 1785 by Count Leopold Reichsgraf von Kollowrat-Krakowsky, the German Grand Prior of Bohemia, who was a well known Freemason. He had already taken a prominent role in establishing the auberge. The building is rich in history related to Freemasonry.

Knights from Poland eventually joined the order in June 1785, hosted at the auberge. The coat-of-arms on the façade remained the one of England and Bavaria but a flag representing the Poles was hosted on the façade. Russian knights joined in January 1797. At this point the coat-of-arms had some additions with an eagle supporting it from below and a crown above it, both symbolic for the Russian knights.

The building remained an auberge until the Order was expelled from the island with the French occupation of Malta. The lodge was ordered to shut down at the auberge by an inquisition order in 1792. However, the lodge itself was probably discontinued around the same time of the French revolution. The secretary of Grand Masters Pinto and de Rohan, Knight Pierre Jean Doublet, who was a freemason, during the French period continued to serve in Malta as a Commissioner.

=== Hospital ===
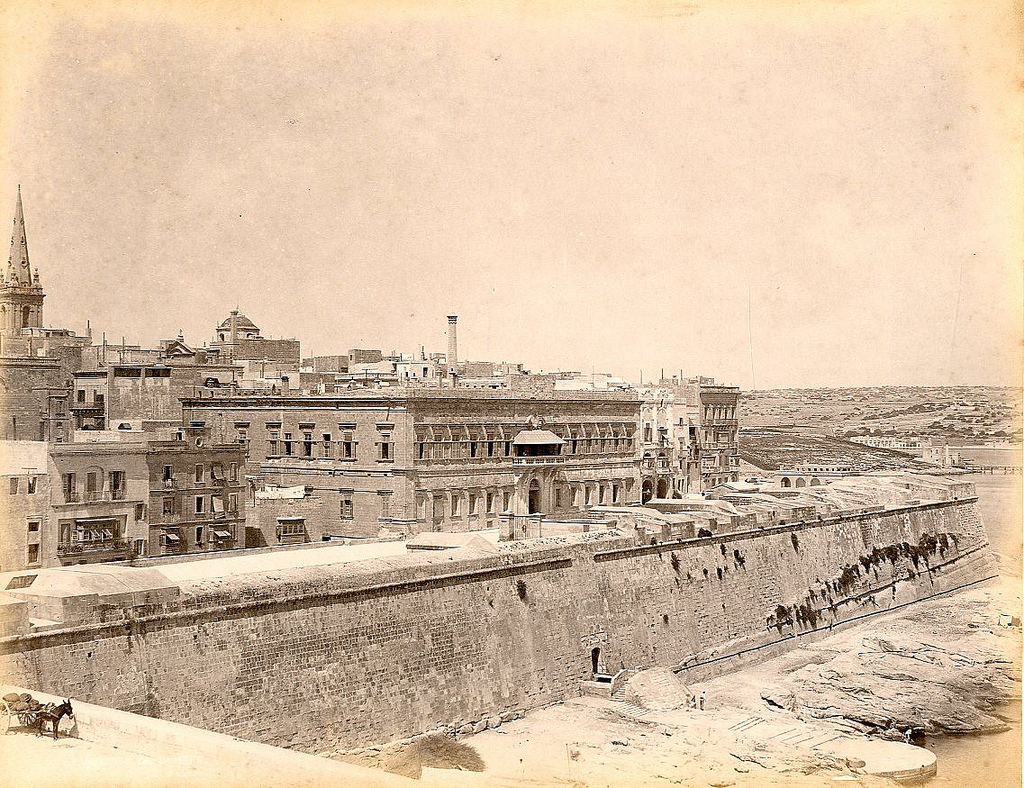
Auberge de Bavière et Angleterre in the 1870s

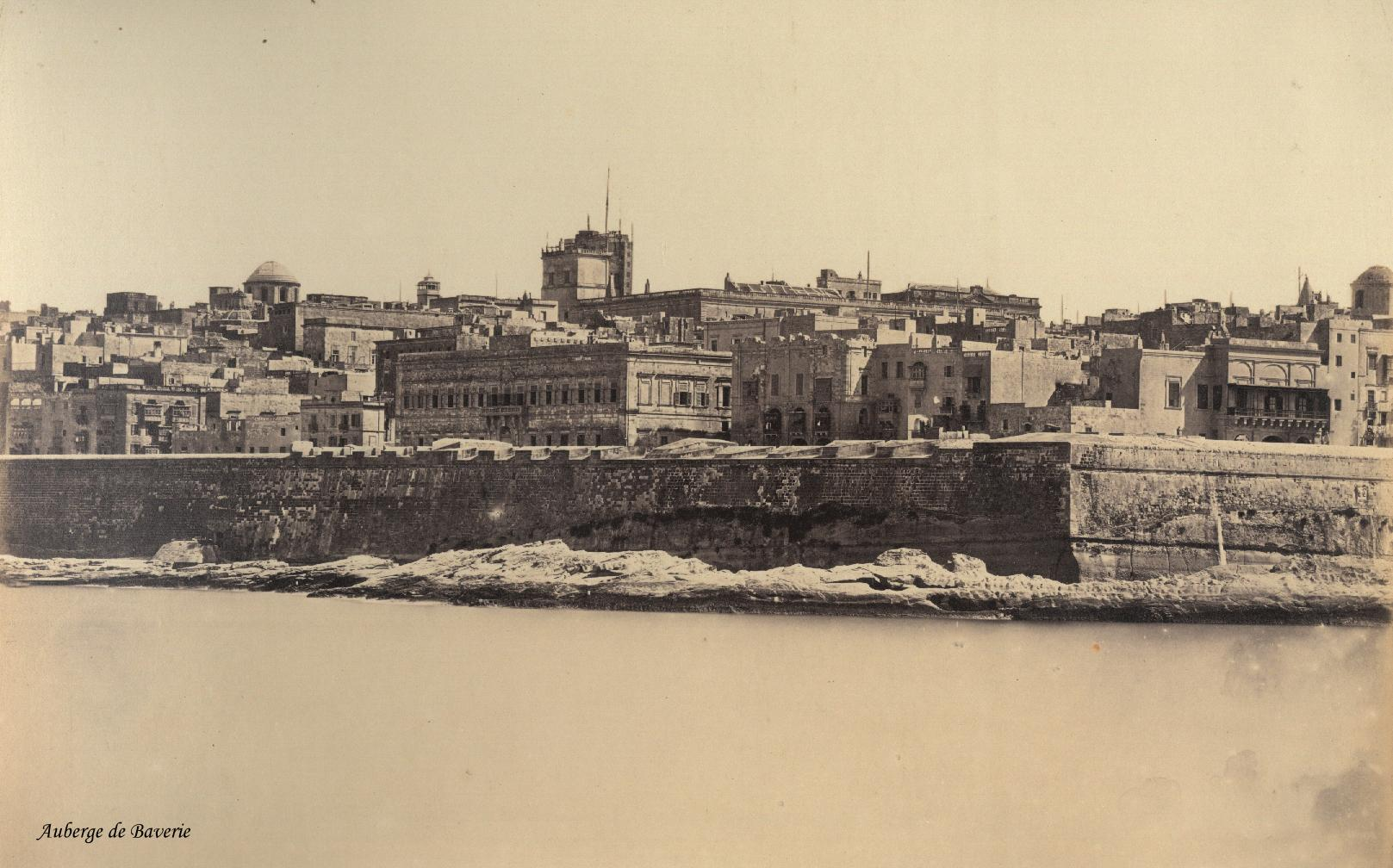
Auberge de Baverie as seen from Fort Tigné c. 1864

When Malta became officially part of the French Republic (1798-1800), the building was converted into a military hospital for French soldiers suffering from different forms of venereal disease. This was a consequence of a rise of prostitution in Malta. Sometimes after Malta became a British Protectorate, the building stopped operating as a hospital for sexual transmitted disease.

The building was taken over by the British military authorities in 1824, and it was used as an officers' mess and later the Command Paymaster's headquarters. On 15 June 1915 it opened as the Bavière Hospital, treating British military personnel injured in World War I, and specializing in severe cases in need of surgery, including head and spine injuries. The hospital initially had 100 beds, but these were later increased to 155. The hospital closed on 14 August 1917.

=== Government building ===
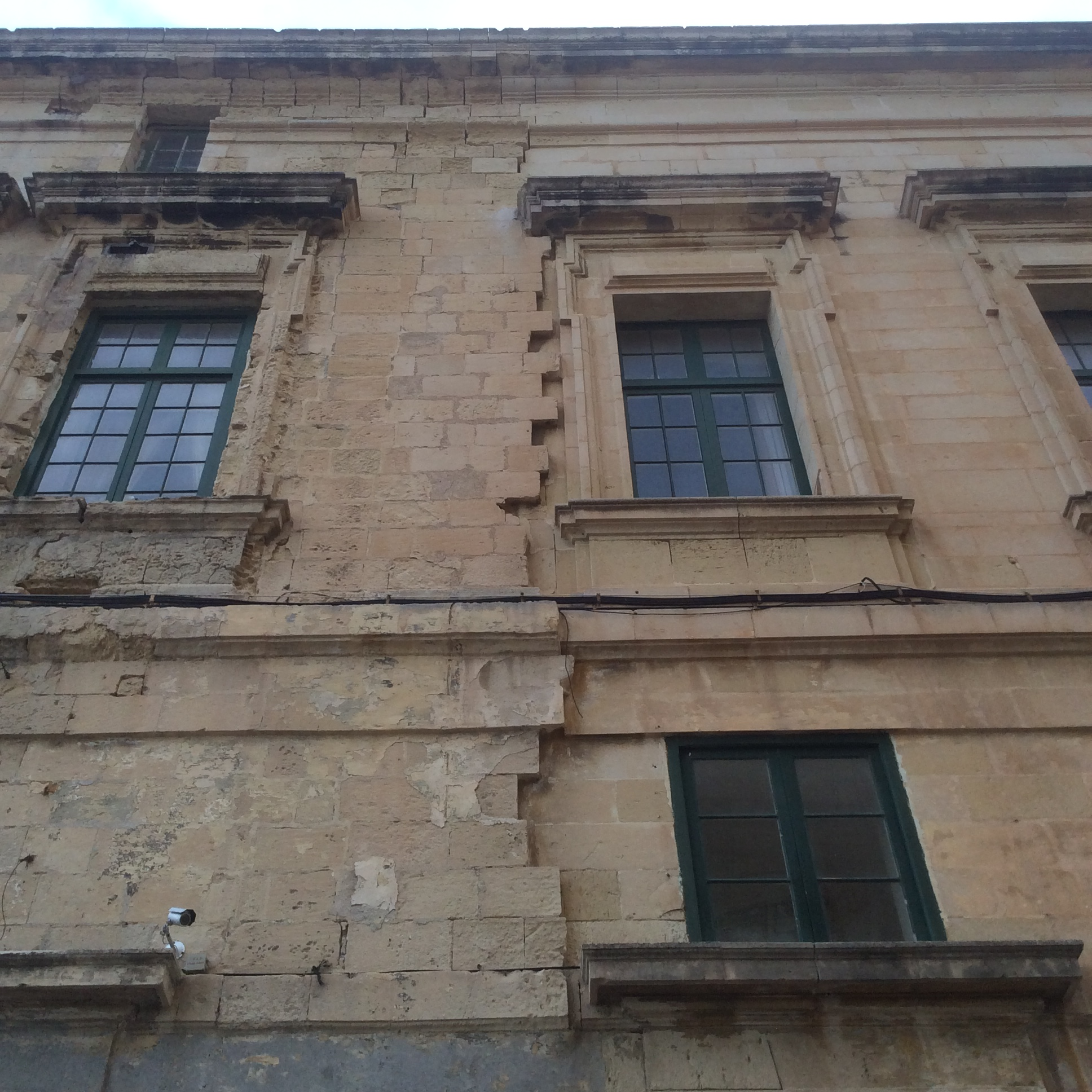
War damage with rebuilt part (right)

The building was handed over to the civilian authorities in 1921 when Malta was given self-government.

In World War II, the palace was converted into a hostel for people whose homes were destroyed by aerial bombardment. The building suffered minor damage in the war, but it was repaired and by the 1960s it became a government school. A direct hit took place in the courtyard and destroyed the side-façade of the building.

The Land Directorate occupied the building from 1979 to 1997, when it was given to the Government Property Department. The palace was rehabilitated and restored in 2001.

During the 2020 coronavirus epidemic, the building was fumigated by the Civil Protection Department.

== Heritage ==
The building was included on the Antiquities List of 1925 together with the other auberges in Valletta.

The auberge is a Grade 1 national monument, and it is also listed on the National Inventory of the Cultural Property of the Maltese Islands.

In May 2010, the building was used for the German television series Ihr Auftrag, Pater Castell, watched by millions of German speakers, featuring as a police headquarters.

Restoration on the building began in September 2018, which is being restored at the same time as the fortifications in the whereabouts are being done.

== Architecture ==
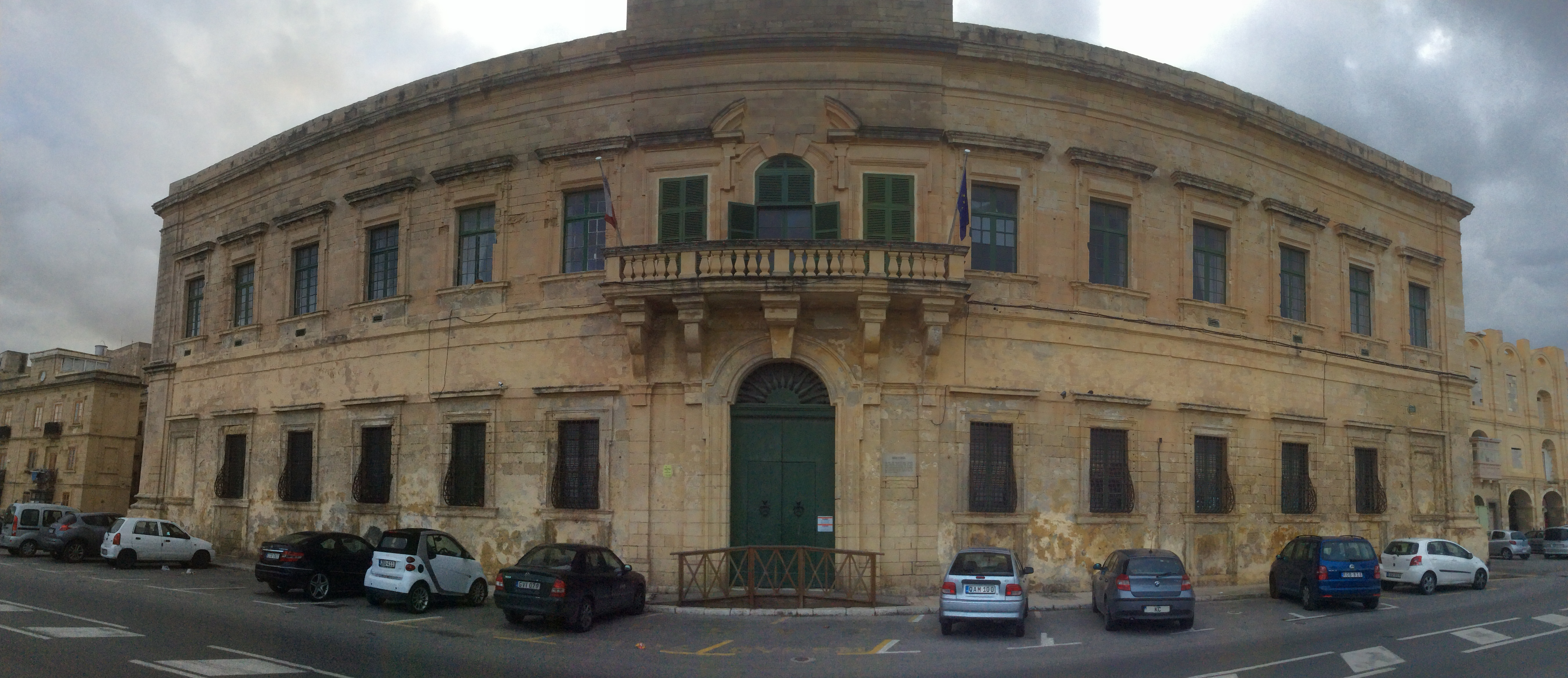
Panorama of the auberge's façade

Auberge de Bavière is a large two-story building. It has an austere façade containing a centrepiece with the main doorway, above which is an open stone balcony. Six rectangular windows decorated with mouldings flank either side of the centrepiece. The corners of the building have large pilasters, and a cornice runs along the entire building. A courtyard is located at the rear of the building, an unusual feature since at the time courtyards were usually placed at the centre. During his visit to the island, Hoare observed that the coat-of-arms of England and Bavaria were attached on the façade of the building to supposedly symbolise the union.

== Commemorative coins ==
Auberge de Bavière was depicted on two commemorative coins minted in 2015 by the Central Bank of Malta. The coins show the auberge's façade on the reverse and the coat of arms of Malta on the obverse.
