= Chorense e Monte =

- Civil parish
- Location in Portugal
- Coordinates: 41.709°N 8.304°W
- Country: Portugal
- Region: Norte
- Intermunic. comm.: Cávado
- District: Braga
- Municipality: Terras de Bouro

Area
  - Total: 20.26 km^{2} (7.82 sq mi)

Population (2011)
  - Total: 580
  - Density: 29/km^{2} (74/sq mi)
- Time zone: UTC+00:00 (WET)
  - Summer (DST): UTC+01:00 (WEST)
- Postal code: 4840
- Patron: Saint Marina and Saint Elizabeth

Chorense e Monte (officially, União das Freguesias de Chorense e Monte) is a Portuguese freguesia ("civil parish"), located in the municipality of Terras de Bouro in the district of Braga. The population in 2011 was 580, in an area of 20.26 km^{2}.

== History ==
It was formed in 2013, under a national administrative reform, by the aggregation of the former parishes of Chorense and Monte.
