= Tabira =

Tabira may refer to:

- Tabira, Nagasaki, Japan
- Tabira, Pernambuco, Brazil

== See also ==
- Tavira (disambiguation)
