= Palazzo Correa =

Former palace in Valletta, Malta

Coordinates: 35.8995°N 14.5129°E

Palazzo Correa, also known as Casa Correa, Correa de Sousa Palace or Palazzo Hompesch, was a 17th-century palace in Valletta, Malta, located in Old Bakery Street. It was built on the designs to architect Carlo Gimach in the Mannerist style, the first in Valletta and very unusual to the period.

It was built in 1689 by Fra Antonio Correa de Sousa, the Balì of Leça, as a residence. It was sold to the Manoel Foundation in 1732, and it was let to Grand Master Ferdinand von Hompesch zu Bolheim from 1787 to 1798. The palace hosted the French minister in Malta, General Vial, during the Peace of Amiens between 1802 and 1803.

The palace was the residence of John Hookham Frere and his wife Elizabeth Jemima, dowager Countess of Erroll from 1821. The couple had several guests including the niece of Elizabeth, Ms Blake in 1825, followed by Honoria Hamilton Chichester. At this palace the Frere couple had looked after an orphaned girl, named Statyra Livedestro, who Frere had rescued from the sea of Turkey; this happened when the Christian Greeks were expelled from Turkey by orders of Kemal Atatürk, that before the event was Greek land, during the exchange of Turkish-Greek population in the early 19th-century.

In the late 19th century, the palace became the main residence of Marquis Emmanuele Scicluna, the President of La Borsa.

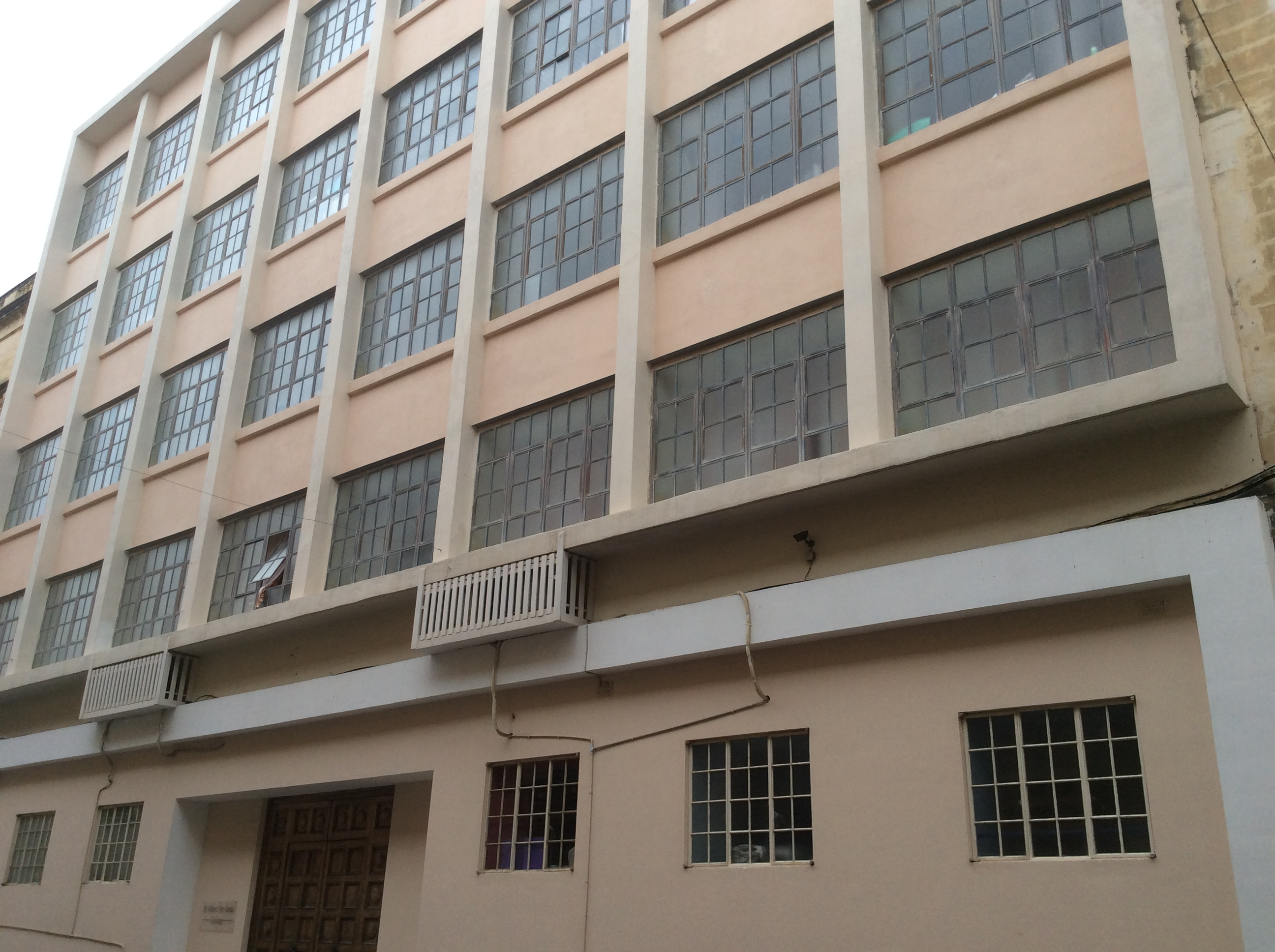
St Albert the Great College

The building was destroyed when it was hit by aerial bombardment in 1942 during World War II. Its site has been rebuilt as St Albert the Great College.

The palace's façade has some resemblance to the façade of the Manoel Theatre.

== See also ==
- Palazzo Dragonara
- Palazzo Parisio (Naxxar)
- La Borsa
