= Arouca Abbey =

Former Cistercian monastery in the Porto metropolitan area of Portugal

- Mosteiro de Arouca
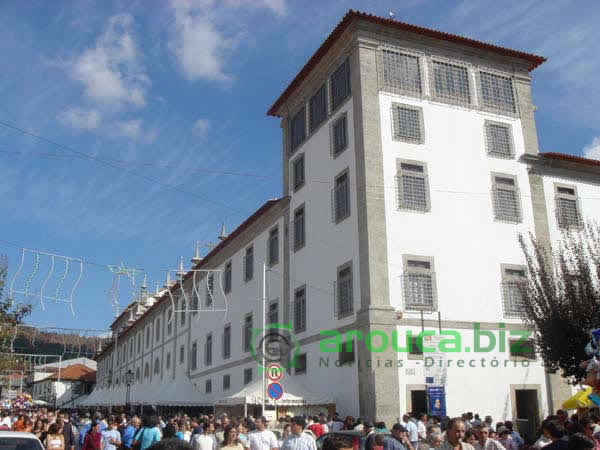
- The dominant facade of the abbey
- Interactive map of Arouca Abbey

Monastery information
- Full name: Abbey of St. Batholomew
- Order: Benedictine (c. 1090-1226), Cistercian
- Established: c. 925
- Disestablished: 1886
- Dedication: St. Peter (c. 925-c. 1090), St. Bartholomew the Apostle
- Diocese: Aveiro

People
- Founders: Loderigo & Vandilo

Architecture
- Status: suppressed
- Functional status: museum & parish church
- Heritage designation: National Monument
- Designated date: 1910
- Architect: Carlo Gimach
- Style: Mannerist, Baroque

Site
- Location: Arouca, Aveiro, Portugal
- Coordinates: 40°55′41″N 8°14′48″W

The Abbey of St. Batholomew, more simply known as the Abbey of Arouca (Portuguese: Mosteiro de Arouca), was a Cistercian monastery of women dating from the 10th century. It is located in Arouca, now in the Porto metropolitan area of Portugal. For much of its existence, it was one of the most influential religious centers in that region of the country.

== History ==
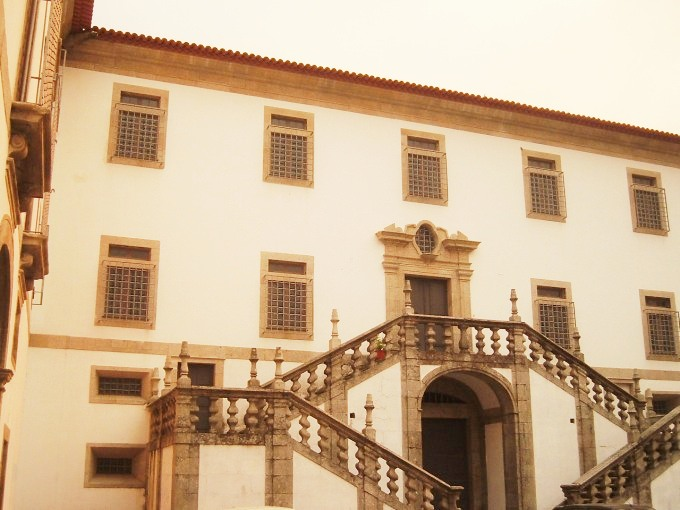
The austere front facade of the monastery

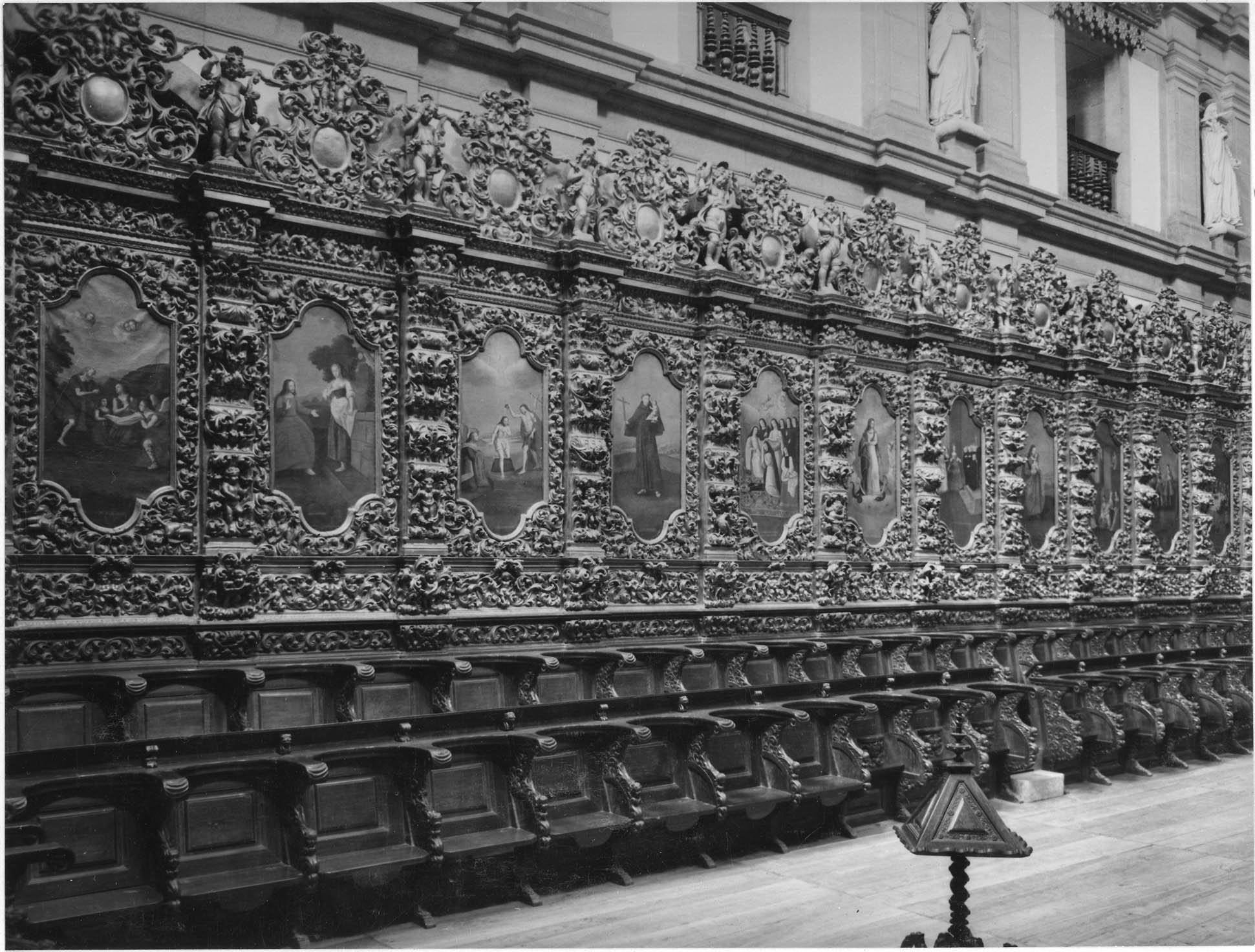
The ornate choir stalls within the choir by António Gomes and Filipe da Silva

=== Early history ===
The monastery was founded in the first half of the 10th century. during the Reconquista of the region from the Moorish invaders in honor of St. Peter. It was founded as a double monastery by two Asturian noblemen, Loderigo and Vandilo from Moldes, as discovered in a fragment of a notice with the initials ERO. Around 1090, the community adopted the Rule of St. Benedict, although it remained a shared institution of both monks and nuns. The oldest documented reference dates to 1091, referring to the old religious community in Arouca.

Sometime between 1132 and 1143, a letter of a votive offering of land was issued by King Afonso I to the monastery. In 1154, the monks were removed and the monastery became a home for only nuns.

In 1226, through the request of the abbess of the monastery, Mafalda of Portugal, a daughter of King Sancho I who had become a nun of the community in 1220, a papal bull was issued to transfer the monastery to the Cistercian Order. By the time of her death, the site was one of the more important monasteries in the peninsula.

Abbess Mafalda was beatified by the Catholic Church in 1792. This in part reflected the position of the abbey in royal favor.

=== Suppression ===
A civil war broke out in Portugal 1828–1834. At its conclusion, the victorious Liberal government made the decision to end state sponsorship of religious communities. They were inspired by the Suppression of the Society of Jesus during the previous century. Thus in May 1834 King Pedro IV declared the Dissolution of the monasteries in Portugal, intending to sell the seized properties to provide for the poor. The first stage of the government action was applied only to communities of men, which were immediately suppressed. In 1862, the law was applied to communities of women, who were not dispersed but were barred from accepting new members, and their assets became subject to seizure. The last nun of the community died in 1886, ending the monastic life of the abbey.

== Architectural elements ==
Vestiges of the rose window suggest that it can be dated to the 14th century, probably removed from a primitive Romanesque place of worship.

From the end of the 15th century to the beginning of the 16th century, there was work on the monastic buildings, including new spaces and altars, constructed under the abbesses Leonor Coutinho and Melícia de Melo. Between 1596 and 1597, panels from the retable were painted by Diogo Teixeira.

At the end of the 17th century, the first reconstructions and expansions of the monastic complex were initiated, in the western and north wings. On 28 February 1701, there was a contract between the abbess and masters António Gomes and João da Costa to remake the altar for 600$000 réis. Yet, the following year (on 24 November) during a state visit, the church was referred to as being in a miserable state. This resulted in a new plan by the noted architect Carlo Gimach for the church. Between 1704 and 1718. work on the church was undertaken, that included the nuns' choir, which would persist for the next thirty years. On 8 February 1722, António Gomes and Filipe da Silva worked on the choir stalls and gilded woodwork for 850$000 réis (completed on 21 October 1724), while on 12 June 1723, a new contract was issued for work on the retable by Luís Vieira da Cruz, at a cost of 1:000$000 rés.

In early 1725, there was a fire in the monastery, but was followed on 22 February by another, that destroyed the abbey, the work on the Church and sleeping quarters, which included damage to recent sculptures by Braga Jacinto Vieira. Repairs initiated almost immediately on the abbey: on 29 April 1733, gildwork on the reformed retable was initiated by João Nunes de Abreu and Manuel Cerqueira Mendes (from Lisbon) for 2,200$000 réis. Similar reconstruction, additions and works in the following years that lasted to the end of the 18th century. This included: the creation of the retable of Senhor dos Passos (in the ante-choir) and the retable of Senhor da Cana Verde (in 1733); construction of new dormitories (between 1733 and 1734) by Gaspar Ferreira; and the organ was repaired by Benito Gomez de Herrera, of 4,300$000 réis (between 1737 and 1738). This was followed by: the execution of the six retables in the church by Miguel Francisco da Silva; execution of the organ by Manuel Bento Gomes (in 1739); gilding of the same retables in the nave (from 8 November 1741); followed by similar gilding in the main chapel by Manuel Cerqueira Mendes (from Lisbon); gilding of the angels in the tomb of Abbess Mafalda and images of St. Bartholomew and St. Bernard of Clairvaux; gilding the organ (in 1743); the retable and front of the altar to São Bento (in the anti-choir) by José da Fonseca Lima (for 170$000 rés); gilding of the retable (in 1744); and the funerary urn dedicated to Santa Mafalda was completed by José Francisco de Paiva and António Faria Soares (in 1793).

By the end of the second half of the 18th century, these grand decorations ultimately lead to completion of the southern and western part of the convent, refectory, capital hall and kitchen. Between 1781 and 1785, the cloister was finally completed.

== Legacy ==
In 1890, the Brotherhood of Rainha Santa Mafalda was created to preserve the artefacts from the monastery. During this period the organ was restored by a priest from Viseu.

At the end of the 19th century, a few lines of walls, that limited the monastery and encircled the village, disappeared following the suppression of the monastic community. This occurred when the roadway connecting Arouca and the coast was constructed.

In 1935, there was another fire at the monastery, resulting in new construction to rehabilitate the site.

On 13 August 1986, the abbey was partially transferred to the Direcção Regional de Entre Douro e Minho (Regional Directorate for Entre Douro e Minho), while in 1990, it was placed into the management of the municipal council of Arouca.

On 1 June 1992, the property was, once again, transferred to the IPPAR Instituto Português do Património Arquitetónico (Portuguese Institute for Architectural Patrimony), by decree 106F/92.

On 20 December 2007, it became the responsibility of the Direção Regional da Cultura do Norte (Regional Directorate for Culture in the North), by dispatch 1130/2007 (Diário da República, Série 2, 245).

== Architecture ==
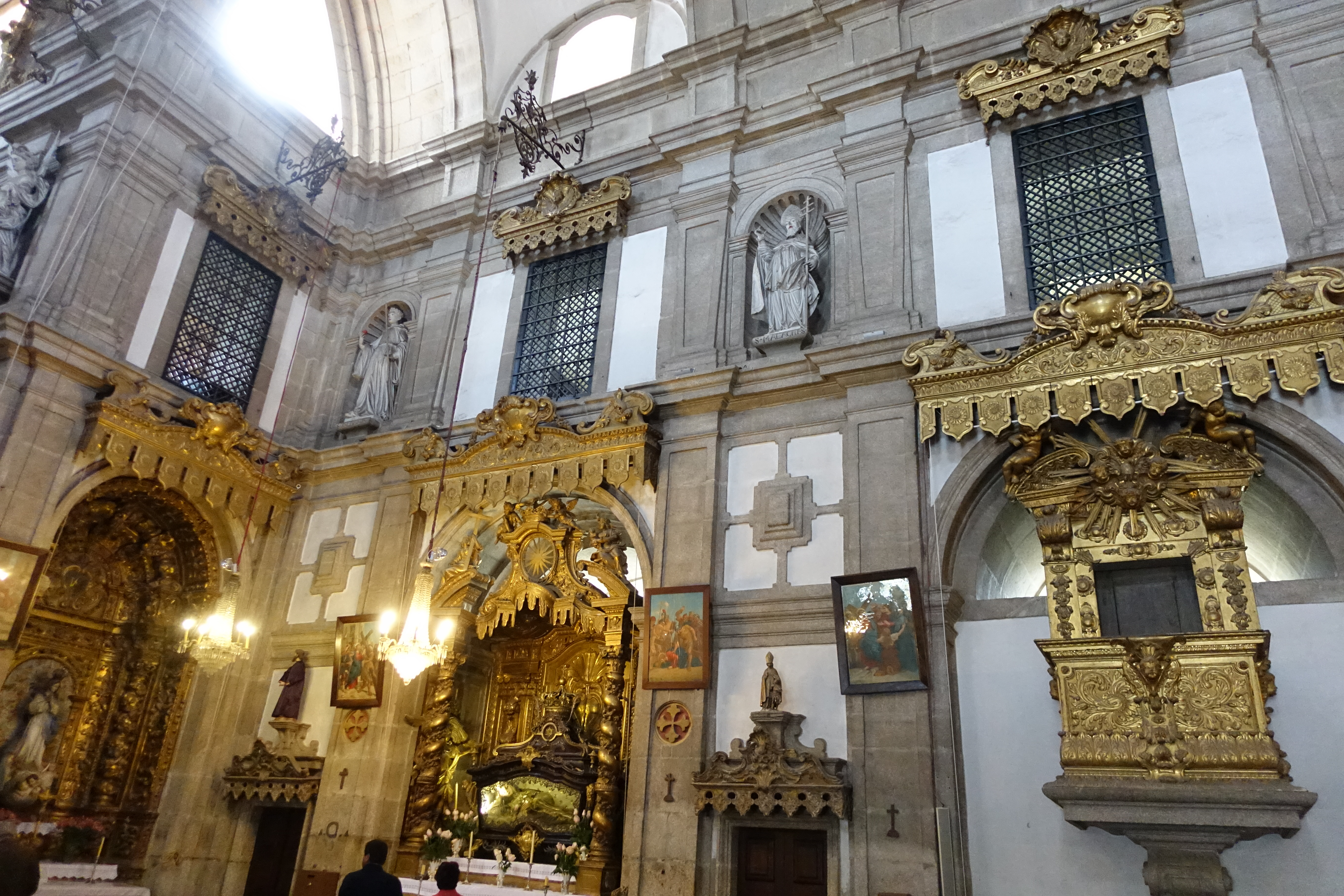
The triumphal archway at the chancel of the abbey

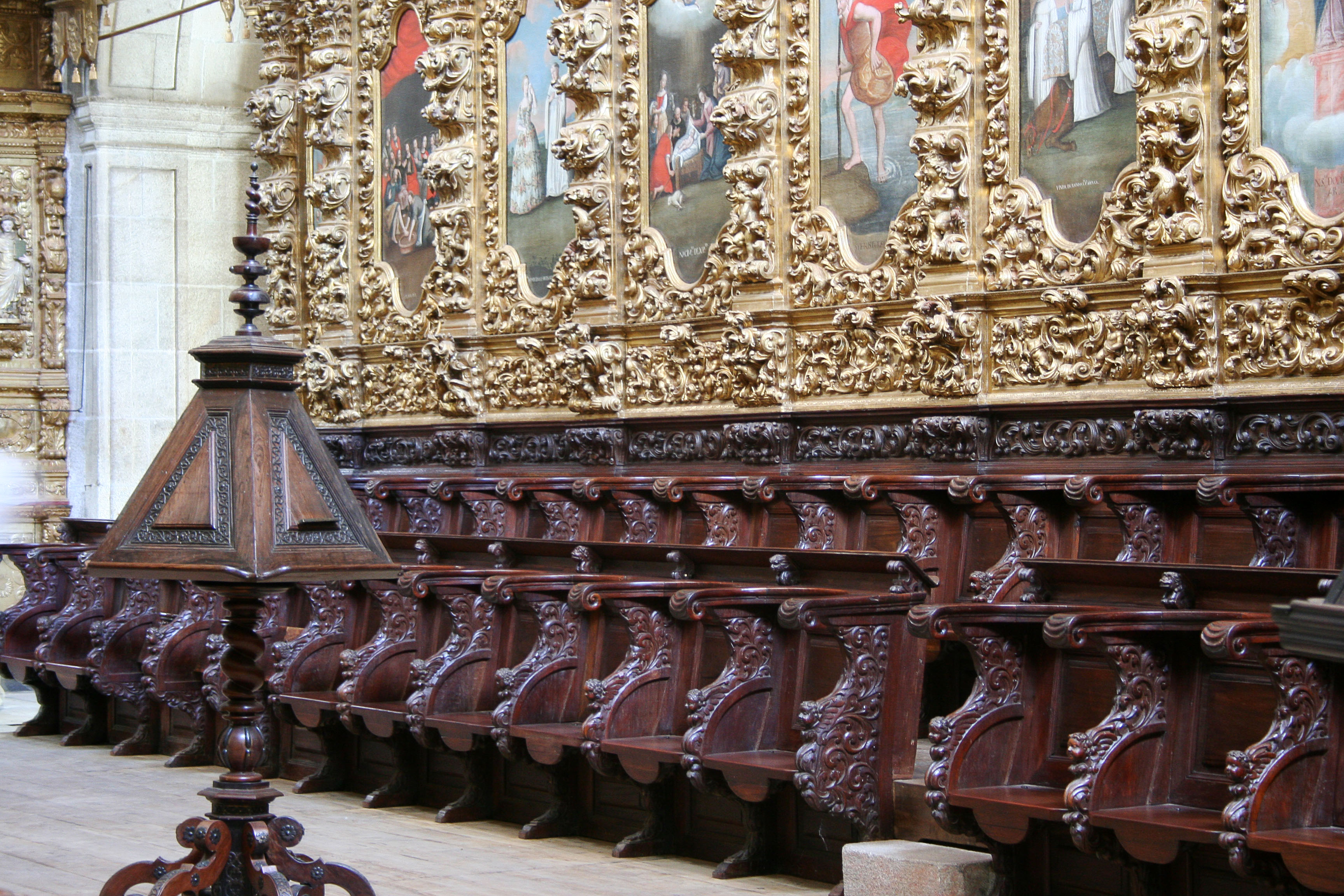
The detailed wood choir stalls

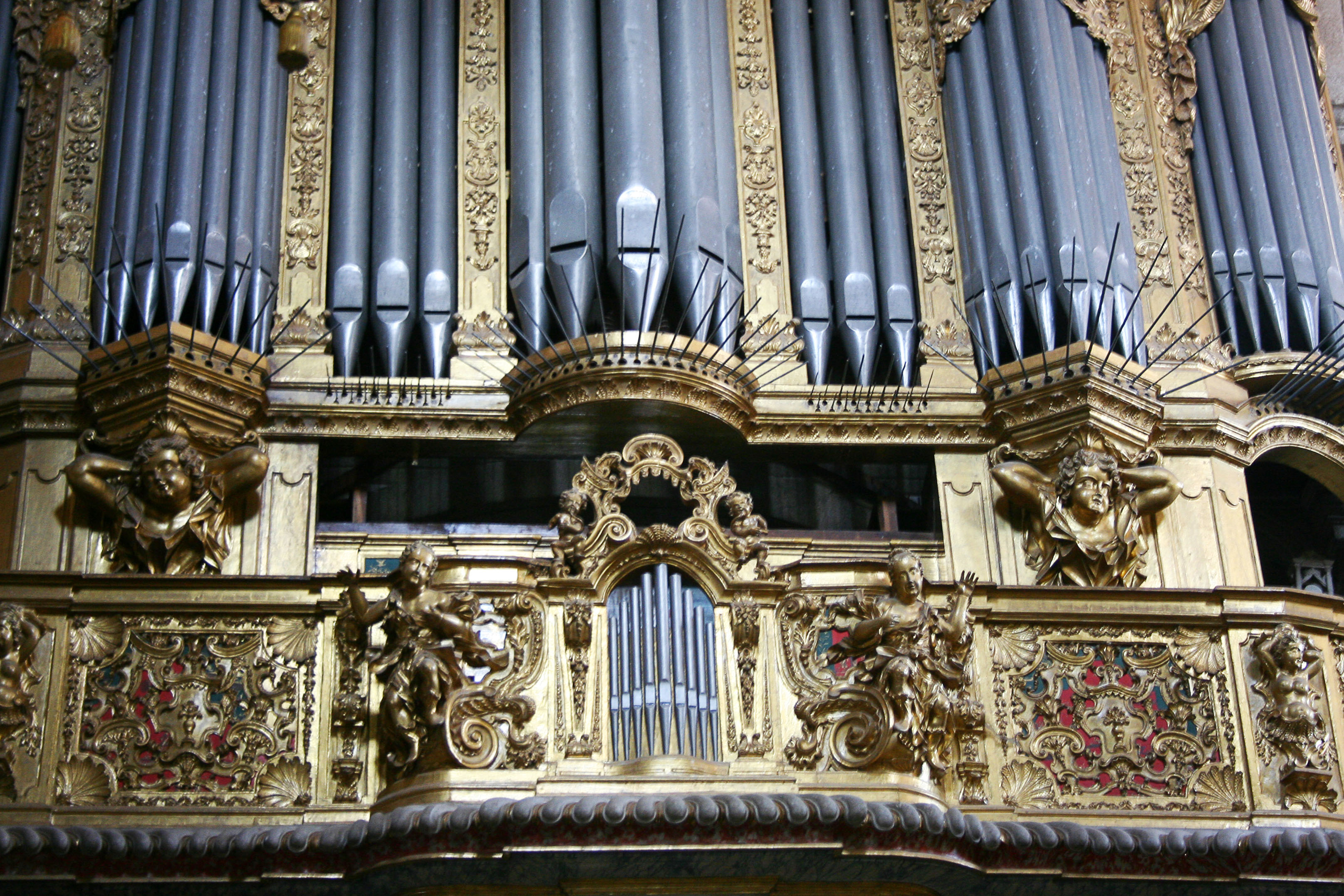
The Baroque era pipe organ

Isolated near the entrance to the city, and located at regional crossroads, the abbey overlooks a valley encircled by the Serra da Freita, the Serra Mó and the Serra de Gamarão.

It is a rectangular plan comprising a principal structure oriented north to south, with annexes on the smaller wings, all covered in tiled roof. The smaller wings (in the north and south) shelter the church and cellars (to the north) and the group of buildings around the cloister and two longitudinal patios (in the south), from north to south, the Pátio do Norte and Pátio dos Comuns, respectively. Around these patios are the former monastic cells. The western wing is limited by two towers/lookouts, three-stories high (four on the towers), rhythmically designed with rectangular vanes with frames of stonework and marked by a system of colossal pilasters at the corners. The pilasters are place on high entablatures and decorative pinnacles at the angles, marked by the church, divided into stonework sections. The lateral portico is implanted in the middle of the navem with a double stonework frame, Tuscan pillars with pyramidal pinnacles and semi-circular decoration. The annexes facades are covered in rectangular windows covered in grade.

=== Interior ===
The church interior consists of three rectangles coinciding with the choir, nave an presbytery. The choir, separated by railing with long high-back choir stalls, line the whole chorus-bass, an intermediary body with rectangular edicules that shelter images and decorated by three lines of arcs with lunettes. Its single larger nave, divided is divided into two registers and rhythmically marked by sections with Tuscan pilaster, while above they appear as inverted pyramids. The lateral chapels include shallow archivolts, with retables of gilded carvings, one with a pulpit and the other with lateral entrance to the temple. Above these are shell-shaped niches alternating with rectangular windows, and vaulted ceiling with lunettes. The main chapel with high altar vertically oriented includes a vaulted ceiling, with illumination coming from the high choir, nave and chancel windows. The cloister is preceded by a galilee formed by arch and portal with an interrupted triangular pediment in the interior, joined to two rectangular gratings. Comprising two floors with archivolts, with segments marked by Tuscan and Ionian capitals along the upper floor, including balconies with iron railings.

The church includes choir stalls forming a "U", that includes 104 stalls, distributed over two rows and middle door. There were also important works in the temple by André Gonçalves and stone sculptures of Braga Jacinto Vieira (1725), while the Joanino (1723-1733) altarpiece was authored by the Bracarense Luís Vieira da Cruz.

Among the works in the Sacred Art Museum are a large group of sculptures, paintings, jewelry, ceramics, books and other artefacts.
