= Santiago (Tavira) =

- Civil parish
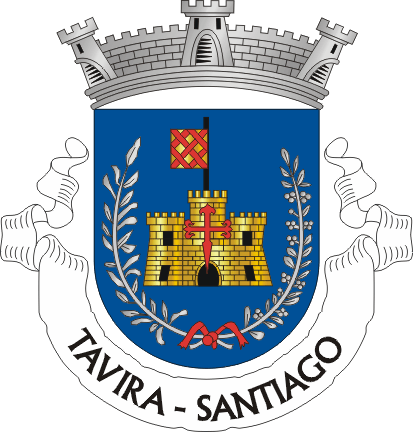
- Coat of arms

- Location in Portugal
- Coordinates: 37°07′N 7°39′W
- Country: Portugal
- Region: Algarve
- Intermunic. comm.: Algarve
- District: Faro
- Municipality: Tavira
- Disbanded: 2013

Area
  - Total: 25.70 km^{2} (9.92 sq mi)

Population (2001)
  - Total: 5,904
  - Density: 229.7/km^{2} (595.0/sq mi)
- Time zone: UTC+00:00 (WET)
  - Summer (DST): UTC+01:00 (WEST)

Santiago is a former civil parish in the municipality of Tavira, Portugal. In 2013, the parish merged into the new parish Tavira (Santa Maria e Santiago).
