= Balança =

- Civil parish
- Location in Portugal
- Coordinates: 41.705°N 8.320°W
- Country: Portugal
- Region: Norte
- Intermunic. comm.: Cávado
- District: Braga
- Municipality: Terras de Bouro

Area
  - Total: 4.45 km^{2} (1.72 sq mi)

Population (2011)
  - Total: 307
  - Density: 69.0/km^{2} (179/sq mi)
- Time zone: UTC+00:00 (WET)
  - Summer (DST): UTC+01:00 (WEST)
- Postal code: 4840
- Patron: São João Baptista
- Website: https://jf-balanca.pt/

Balança is a Portuguese freguesia ("civil parish"), located in the municipality of Terras de Bouro in the district of Braga. The population in 2011 was 307, in an area of 4.45 km^{2}.
