= Tavira (Santa Maria e Santiago) =

- Civil parish
- Location in Portugal
- Coordinates: 37.126°N 7.651°W
- Country: Portugal
- Region: Algarve
- Intermunic. comm.: Algarve
- District: Faro
- Municipality: Tavira

Area
  - Total: 147.99 km^{2} (57.14 sq mi)

Population (2011)
  - Total: 15,133
  - Density: 102.26/km^{2} (264.84/sq mi)
- Time zone: UTC+00:00 (WET)
  - Summer (DST): UTC+01:00 (WEST)

Tavira (Santa Maria e Santiago) is a civil parish in the municipality of Tavira, Portugal. It was formed in 2013 by the merger of the former parishes Santa Maria and Santiago. The population in 2011 was 15,133, in an area of 147.99 km^{2}.
