= Carvalheira =

- Civil parish
- Location in Portugal
- Coordinates: 41.746°N 8.234°W
- Country: Portugal
- Region: Norte
- Intermunic. comm.: Cávado
- District: Braga
- Municipality: Terras de Bouro

Area
  - Total: 9.93 km^{2} (3.83 sq mi)

Population (2021)
  - Total: 292
  - Density: 29.4/km^{2} (76.2/sq mi)
- Time zone: UTC+00:00 (WET)
  - Summer (DST): UTC+01:00 (WEST)
- Postal code: 4840
- Patron: São Paio

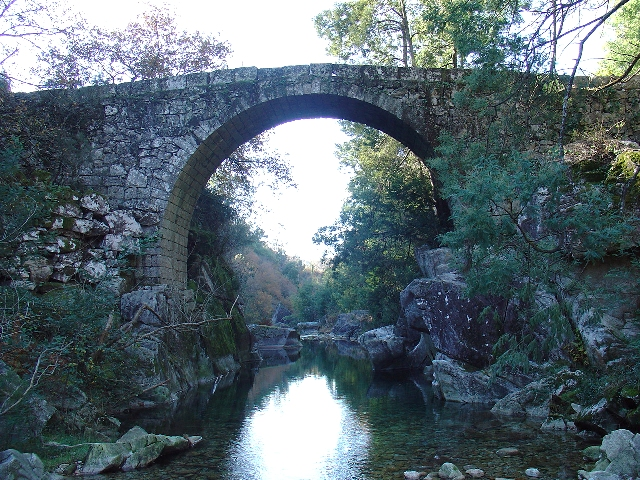
Quintão Bridge - A medieval bridge located in Carvalheira - Terras de Bouro

Carvalheira is a Portuguese freguesia ("civil parish"), located in the municipality of Terras de Bouro in the district of Braga. The population in 2021 was 292, in an area of 9.93 km^{2}.

== History ==
In the inquiries of Afonso II in 1220, Carvalheira was referred to as "Sancto Pelagio de Carvaleira", and was a "reguengo", i.e. the King's land, which was rented for agricultural products.

In 1258, in the inquiries of Afonso III, the parish was referred to as "Sancti Pelagii de Carvaleira". It was described as a rich land that produced onions, garlic, wheat, barley, chestnuts, honey and wax, as well as some wine, goats, piglets, and butter. Its inhabitants were obliged to defend the border in Portela do Homem and to deliver wood and boards to assist with building the castle of Bouro.
