= Granja Nova =

Civil parish in the municipality of Tarouca, Portugal

- Civil parish
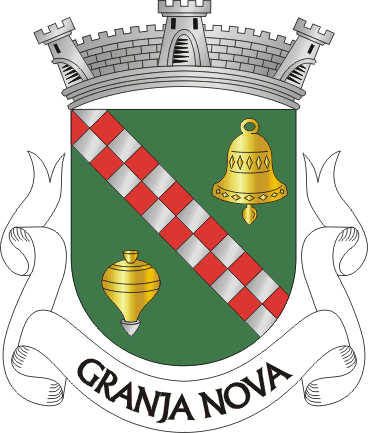
- Coat of arms

- Location in Portugal
- Coordinates: 41.016667°N 7.716667°W
- Country: Portugal
- Region: Norte
- Intermunic. comm.: Douro
- District: Viseu
- Municipality: Tarouca

Area
  - Total: 6.86 km^{2} (2.65 sq mi)

Population (2011)
  - Total: 396
  - Density: 57.7/km^{2} (150/sq mi)
- Time zone: UTC+00:00 (WET)
  - Summer (DST): UTC+01:00 (WEST)

Granja Nova is a civil parish in the municipality of Tarouca, Portugal. The population in 2011 was 396 and the population density was 57 inhabitants per square kilometre, in an area of 6.86 km^{2}.
