= Santa Maria (Tavira) =

- Civil parish
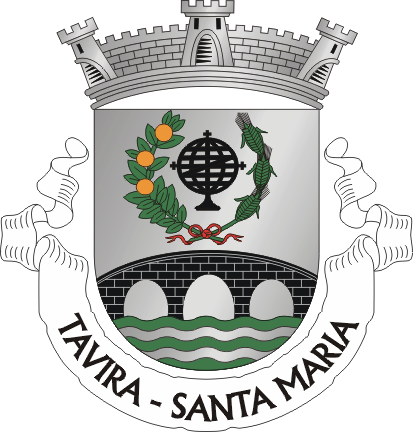
- Coat of arms

- Location in Portugal
- Coordinates: 37°11′N 7°40′W
- Country: Portugal
- Region: Algarve
- Intermunic. comm.: Algarve
- District: Faro
- Municipality: Tavira
- Disbanded: 2013

Area
  - Total: 135.09 km^{2} (52.16 sq mi)

Population (2001)
  - Total: 6,672
  - Density: 49.39/km^{2} (127.9/sq mi)
- Time zone: UTC+00:00 (WET)
  - Summer (DST): UTC+01:00 (WEST)
- Website: http://www.jf-santamariadetavira.pt

Santa Maria de Tavira (or just Santa Maria) is a former civil parish in the municipality of Tavira, Portugal. In 2013, the parish merged into the new parish Tavira (Santa Maria e Santiago). It was the main parish of the city of Tavira.
