= São João de Tarouca =

Civil parish in the municipality of Tarouca, Portugal

- Civil parish
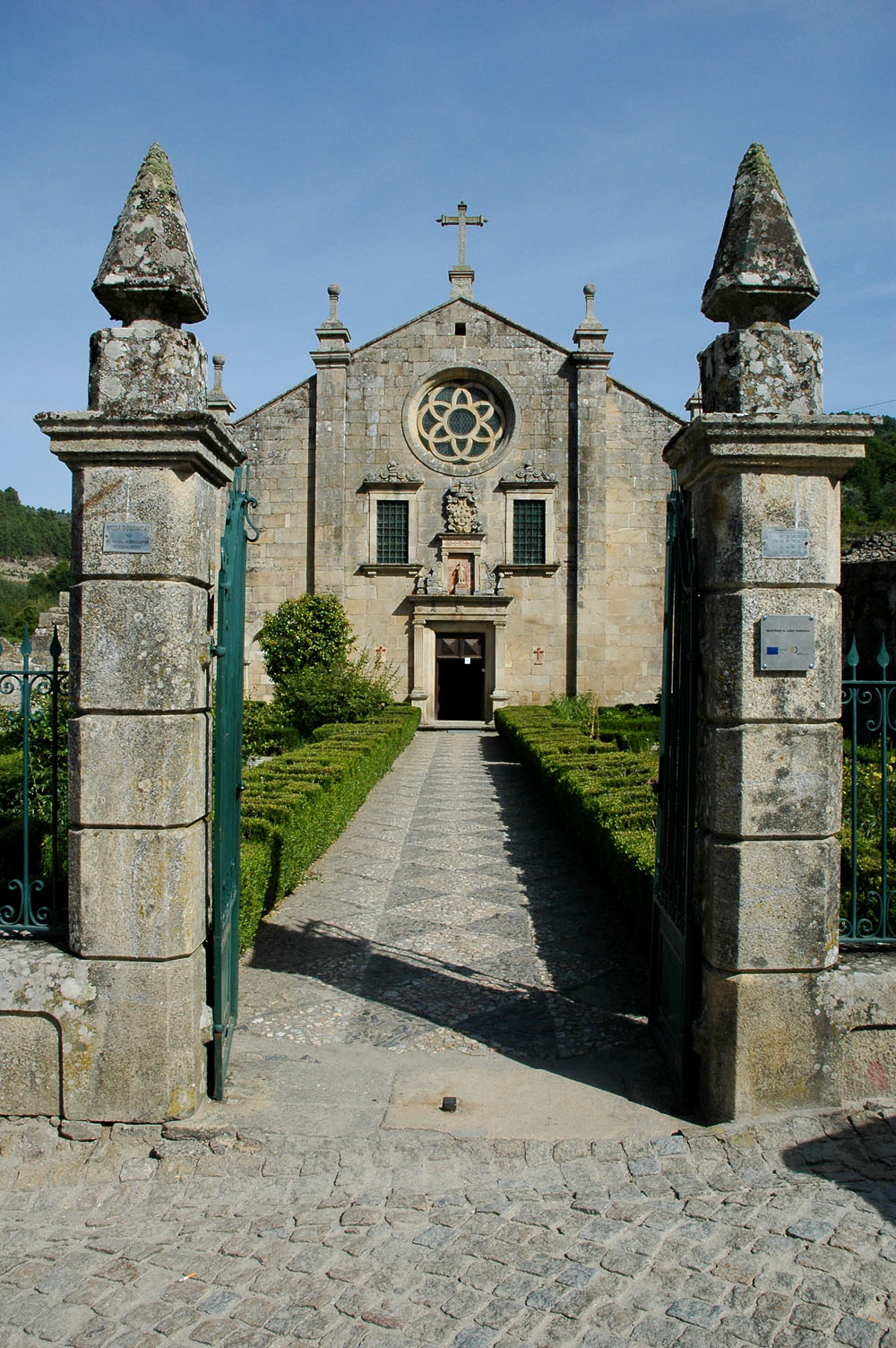
- Monastery in São João de Tarouca

- Location in Portugal
- Coordinates: 40.983333°N 7.733333°W
- Country: Portugal
- Region: Norte
- Intermunic. comm.: Douro
- District: Viseu
- Municipality: Tarouca

Area
  - Total: 22.46 km^{2} (8.67 sq mi)

Population (2011)
  - Total: 606
  - Density: 27.0/km^{2} (69.9/sq mi)
- Time zone: UTC+00:00 (WET)
  - Summer (DST): UTC+01:00 (WEST)

São João de Tarouca is a civil parish in the municipality of Tarouca, Portugal. The population in 2011 was 606 and population density was 27 inhabitants per square kilometre, in an area of 22.46 km^{2}.

== Gallery ==
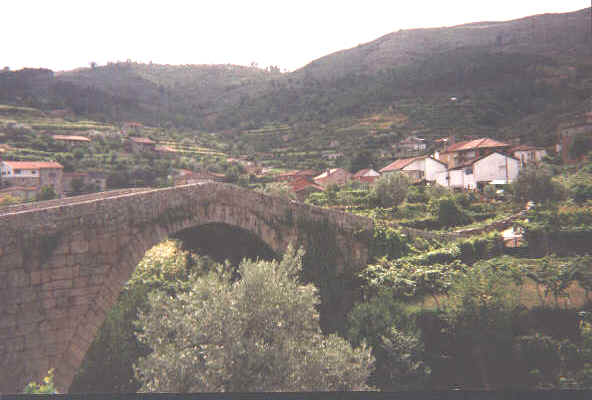

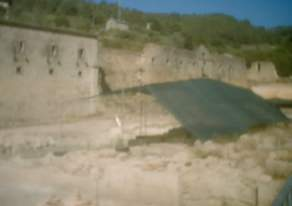

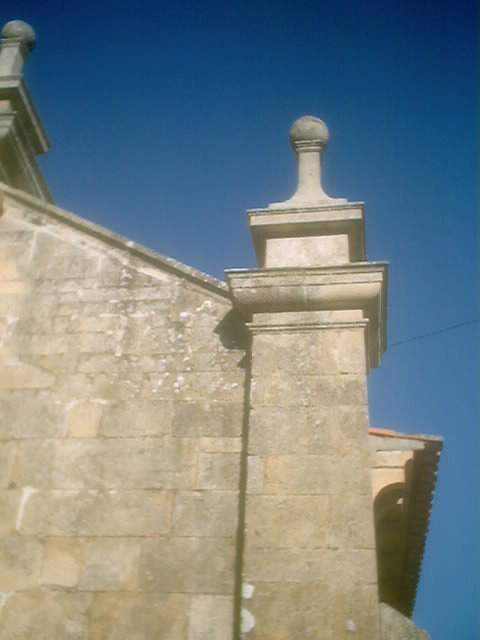

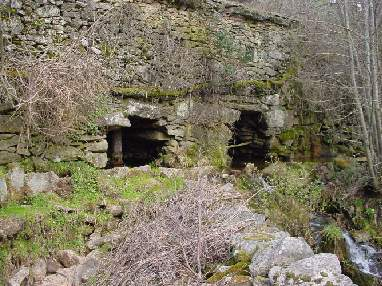

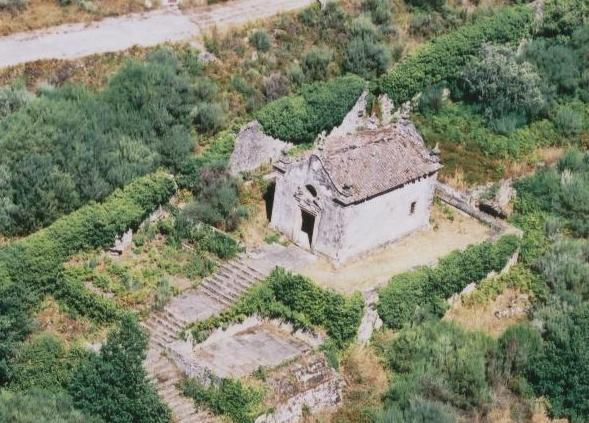
