= Tarouca =

- Municipality
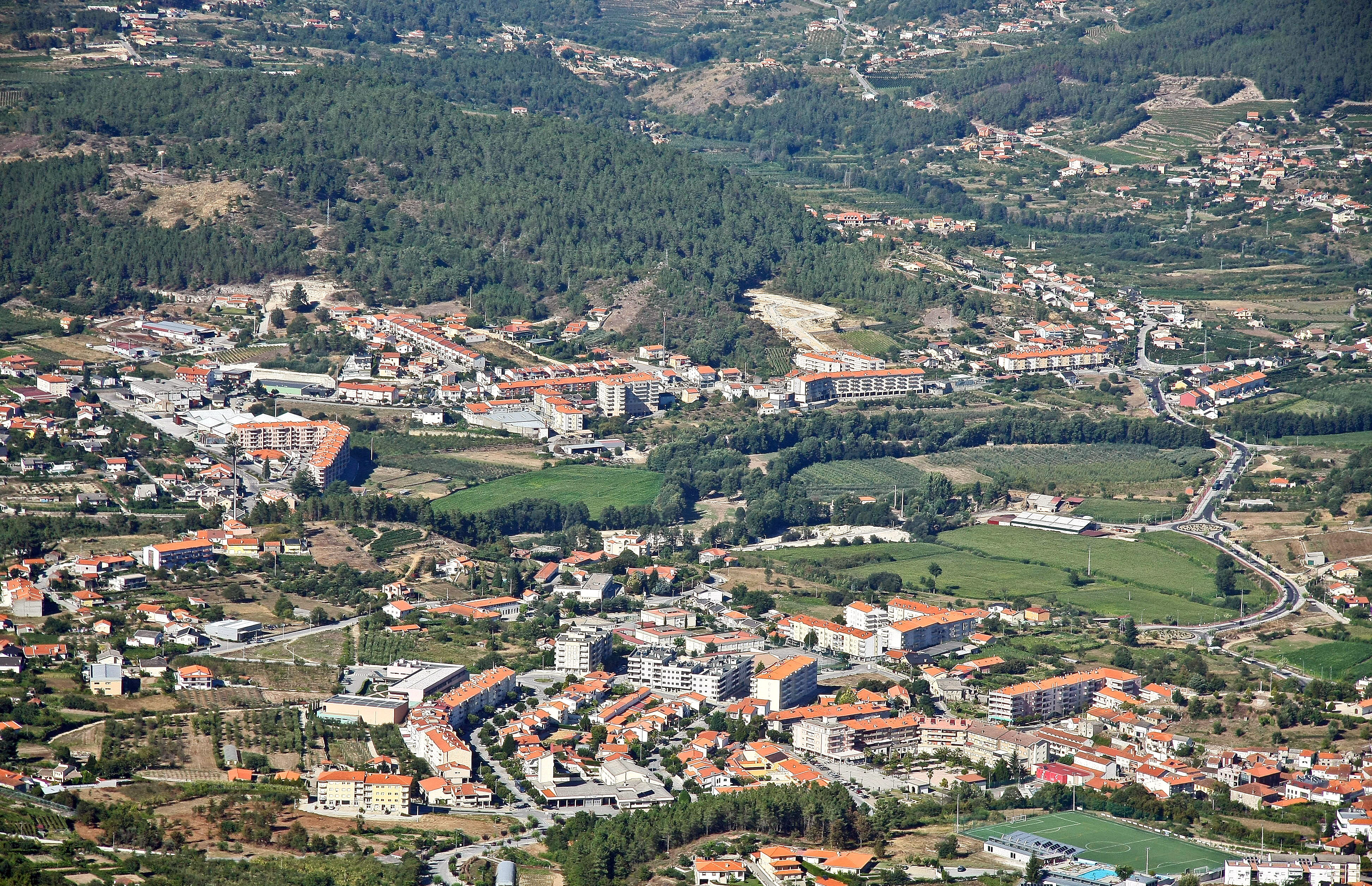
- View of Tarouca

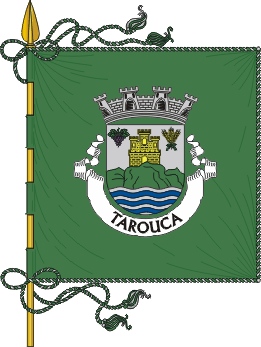
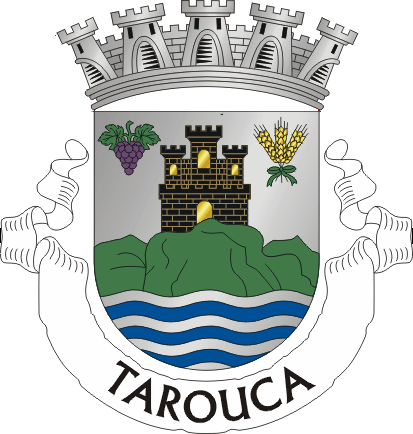
- Flag Coat of arms
- Interactive map of Tarouca
- Coordinates: 41°01′N 7°46′W
- Country: Portugal
- Region: Norte
- Intermunic. comm.: Douro
- District: Viseu
- Parishes: 7

Government
  - President: Mário Ferreira (PS)

Area
  - Total: 100.08 km^{2} (38.64 sq mi)

Population (2011)
  - Total: 8,046
  - Density: 80.40/km^{2} (208.2/sq mi)
- Time zone: UTC+00:00 (WET)
  - Summer (DST): UTC+01:00 (WEST)

Tarouca (European Portuguese pronunciation: [tɐˈɾokɐ]) is a municipality and a city in Viseu District in Norte Region and Douro Subregion in Portugal. The population in 2011 was 8,046, in an area of 100.08 km^{2}.

The city of Tarouca proper has about 3,400 residents; it was promoted to city in December 2004. The present mayor is Mário Caetano Teixeira Ferreira, elected by the Socialist Party. The municipal holiday is June 29.

== Parishes ==
Administratively, the municipality is divided into 7 civil parishes (freguesias):

- Gouviães e Ucanha
- Granja Nova
- Mondim da Beira
- Salzedas
- São João de Tarouca
- Tarouca e Dálvares
- Várzea da Serra

== Notable people ==
- José Leite de Vasconcelos (1858 in Ucanha, Tarouca – 1941) a Portuguese ethnographer, archaeologist and author who wrote extensively on Portuguese philology and prehistory.
