= Campo do Gerês =

- Civil parish
- Location in Portugal
- Coordinates: 41.758°N 8.198°W
- Country: Portugal
- Region: Norte
- Intermunic. comm.: Cávado
- District: Braga
- Municipality: Terras de Bouro

Area
  - Total: 62.38 km^{2} (24.09 sq mi)
- Elevation: 630 m (2,070 ft)

Population (2011)
  - Total: 149
  - Density: 2.4/km^{2} (6.2/sq mi)
- Time zone: UTC+00:00 (WET)
  - Summer (DST): UTC+01:00 (WEST)
- Postal code: 4840
- Patron: Saint John

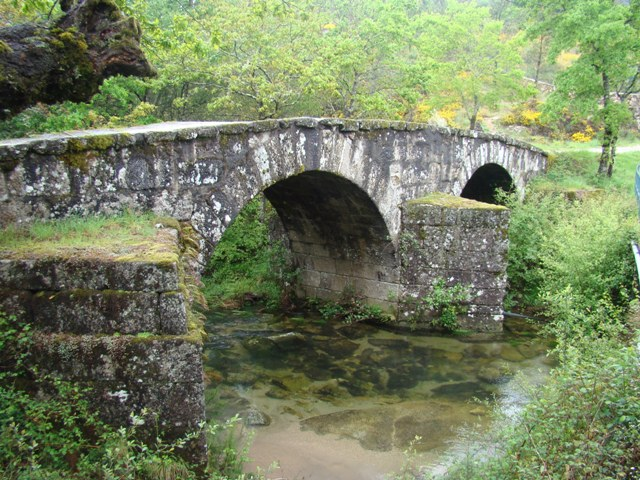
bridge in Campo do Gerês

Campo do Gerês is a Portuguese freguesia ("civil parish"), located in the municipality of Terras de Bouro in the district of Braga. The population in 2011 was 149, in an area of 62.38 km^{2}.

== Description ==
The parish is located within the Peneda-Gerês National Park, on the east bank of the Homem River. It is believed to be an ancient settlement, thanks to numerous findings that testify to an archaic, persistent and continuous human occupation of its territory, from prehistoric times until today. Some of the main pieces of evidence of this are the megalithic tombs of Bouça da Chã, Funde Vila and Bouça do Cruzeiro, as well as Castro de Calcedónia.

Located north of Campo do Gerês, the dam of Vilarinho da Furna constitutes one of the main attractions in the local area.
