= Terras de Bouro =

- Municipality
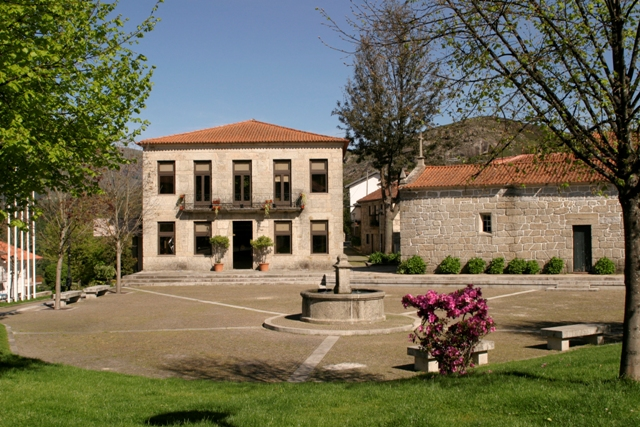

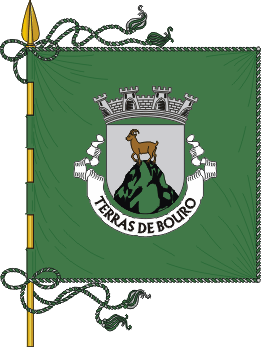
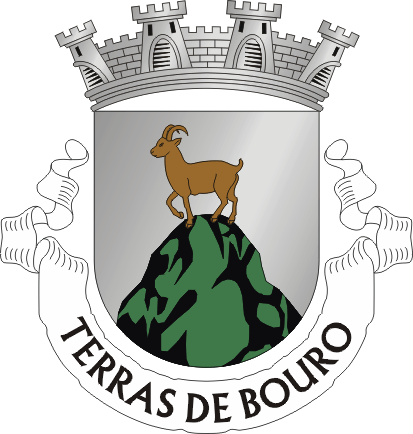
- Flag Coat of arms
- Interactive map of Terras de Bouro
- Coordinates: 41°43′N 8°18′W
- Country: Portugal
- Region: Norte
- Intermunic. comm.: Cávado
- District: Braga
- Parishes: 14

Government
  - President: Manuel Tibo (PSD)

Area
  - Total: 277.46 km^{2} (107.13 sq mi)

Population (2011)
  - Total: 7,253
  - Density: 26.14/km^{2} (67.70/sq mi)
- Time zone: UTC+00:00 (WET)
  - Summer (DST): UTC+01:00 (WEST)
- Website: http://www.cm-terrasdebouro.pt

Terras de Bouro (Portuguese pronunciation: [ˈtɛʁɐʒ ðɨ ˈβoɾu]), also known as Terras de Boiro, is a municipality in the district of Braga in Portugal. The population in 2011 was 7,253, in an area of 277.46 km². It is bordered to the north by Ponte da Barca and Spain, to the east by Montalegre, to the south by Vieira do Minho, to the southwest by Amares, and to the west by Vila Verde. Its municipal seat of power is in Town of Terras de Bouro Portuguese: Vila de Terras de Bouro, located in the Moimenta parish. Said town was previously named Vila da Cova, which made Terras de Bouro the only municipality in Portugal with a unique name (instead of simply being named after its seat of power). The town's name would eventually be changed in 2005 to match that of the municipality, getting rid of this exception.

The present Mayor is Manuel Tibo, elected by the PSD. The municipal holiday is 20 October, day that celebrates the granting of a charter by King D. Manuel I in 1514 .

== History ==
The Germanic tribe of the Buri accompanied the Suebi in their invasion of the Iberian Peninsula and establishment in Gallaecia (modern northern Portugal). The Buri settled in the region between the rivers Cávado and Homem, in the area known thereafter as Terras de Boiro or Terras de Bouro (Lands of the Buri).

== Parishes ==
Administratively, the municipality is divided into 14 civil parishes (freguesias):

- Balança
- Campo do Gerês
- Carvalheira
- Chamoim e Vilar
- Chorense e Monte
- Cibões e Brufe
- Covide
- Gondoriz
- Moimenta
- Ribeira
- Rio Caldo
- Souto
- Valdosende
- Vilar da Veiga

== See also ==
- Vilarinho da Furna
