= Covide =

- Civil parish
- Location in Portugal
- Coordinates: 41.737°N 8.213°W
- Country: Portugal
- Region: Norte
- Intermunic. comm.: Cávado
- District: Braga
- Municipality: Terras de Bouro

Area
  - Total: 19.87 km^{2} (7.67 sq mi)

Population (2011)
  - Total: 343
  - Density: 17.3/km^{2} (44.7/sq mi)
- Time zone: UTC+00:00 (WET)
  - Summer (DST): UTC+01:00 (WEST)
- Postal code: 4840
- Patron: Santa Eufémia

Covide is a Portuguese freguesia ("civil parish"), located in the municipality of Terras de Bouro in the district of Braga. The population in 2011 was 343, in an area of 19.87 km^{2}. The village is located on the outskirts of the Peneda-Gerês National Park. The Via Nova, a Roman road crosses through the village.

The village received attention during the COVID-19 pandemic due to the village's name sounding similar to the name of the disease.
