= Mondim da Beira =

- Civil parish
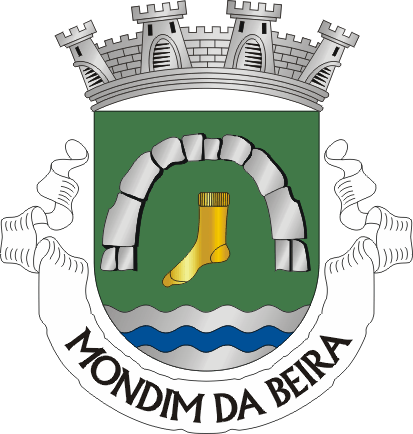
- Coat of arms

- Location in Portugal
- Coordinates: 41.016°N 7.747°W
- Country: Portugal
- Region: Norte
- Intermunic. comm.: Douro
- District: Viseu
- Municipality: Tarouca

Area
  - Total: 7.08 km^{2} (2.73 sq mi)

Population (2011)
  - Total: 786
  - Density: 110/km^{2} (290/sq mi)
- Time zone: UTC+00:00 (WET)
  - Summer (DST): UTC+01:00 (WEST)

Mondim da Beira is a civil parish in the municipality of Tarouca, Portugal. The population in 2011 was 786, in an area of 7.08 km^{2}. Particularly notable is the presence of a Roman bridge made between the 13th and 14th centuries.
