= Salzedas =

Civil parish in the municipality of Tarouca, Portugal

- Civil parish
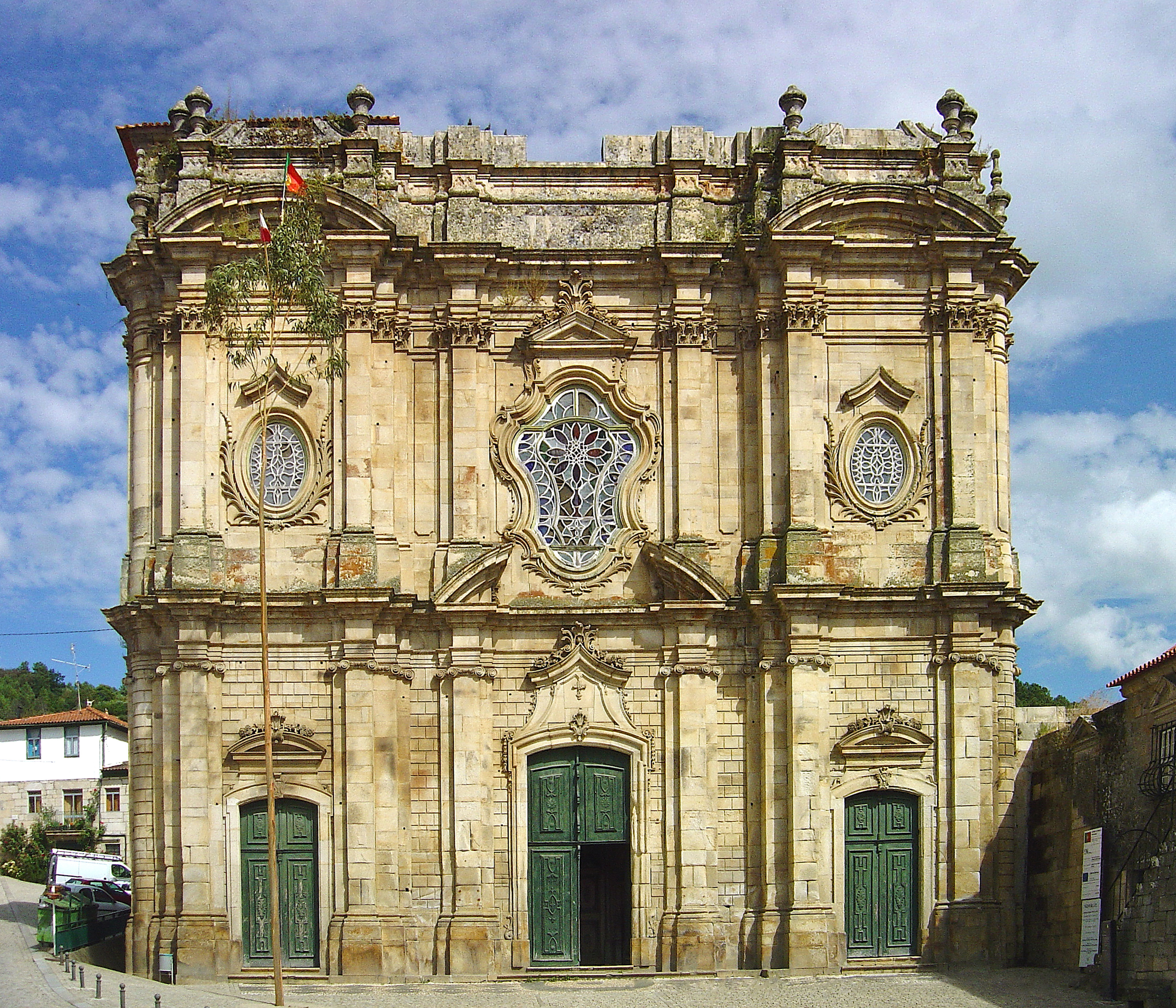
- Monastery in Salzedas

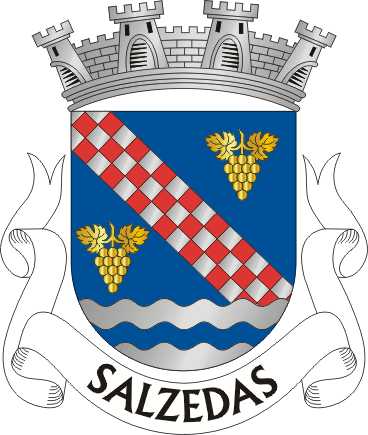
- Coat of arms

- Location in Portugal
- Coordinates: 41.05°N 7.716667°W
- Country: Portugal
- Region: Norte
- Intermunic. comm.: Douro
- District: Viseu
- Municipality: Tarouca

Area
  - Total: 8.92 km^{2} (3.44 sq mi)

Population (2011)
  - Total: 767
  - Density: 86.0/km^{2} (223/sq mi)
- Time zone: UTC+00:00 (WET)
  - Summer (DST): UTC+01:00 (WEST)

Salzedas is a civil parish in the municipality of Tarouca, Portugal. The population in 2011 was 767 and population density was 86 inhabitants per square kilometre, in an area of 8.92 km^{2}.
