= São Clemente (Loulé) =

Civil parish in Loulé, Portugal

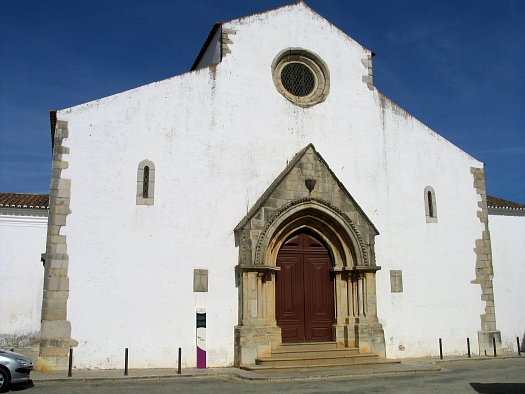
Mother Church of Loulé

São Clemente is a Portuguese civil parish (freguesia) in the municipality of Loulé.

The church of St. Clemente (Portuguese: Igreja Matriz de São Clemente) is the oldest and most important church in Loulé. It dates back to the second half of the 13th century and was built on the site of a former mosque The Church built in Gothic style consists of three naves, divided by Gothic arches supported by narrow columns. In the 16th century, several side chapels were added and five altarpieces were built. Located across the church is Jardim dos Amuados which is an old Arab Muslim cemetery.

The St. Clemente Church bell tower is the oldest part of the church. It dates to the period of Muslim Moor rule in Portugal. It was the original minaret of a former mosque and used for issuing the Islamic call to prayer (Adhaan) five times a day for faithful to come to the mosque for congregation. It is one of the very few remaining Moorish minarets and mosque structures in Portugal.

On 20 June 1924, the church was classified as a national monument by Decree No. 9842.

== Gallery ==
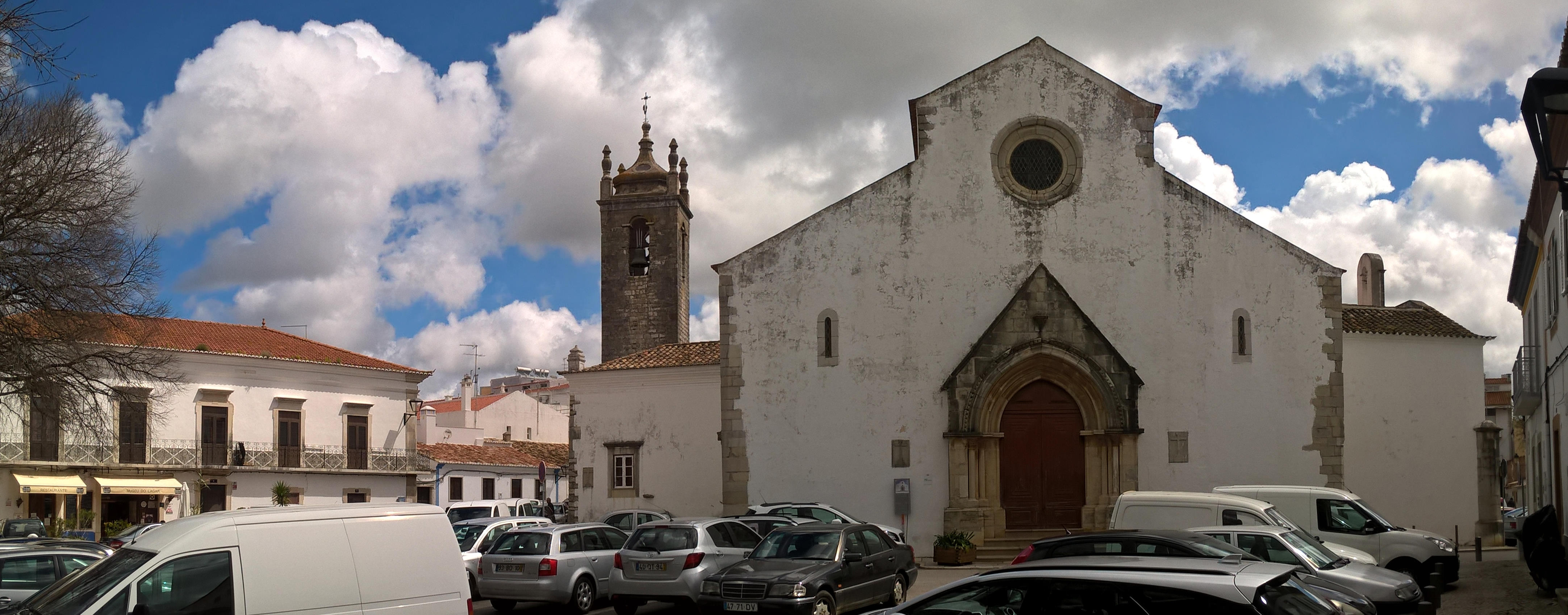
Front view of Church of St. Clemente.

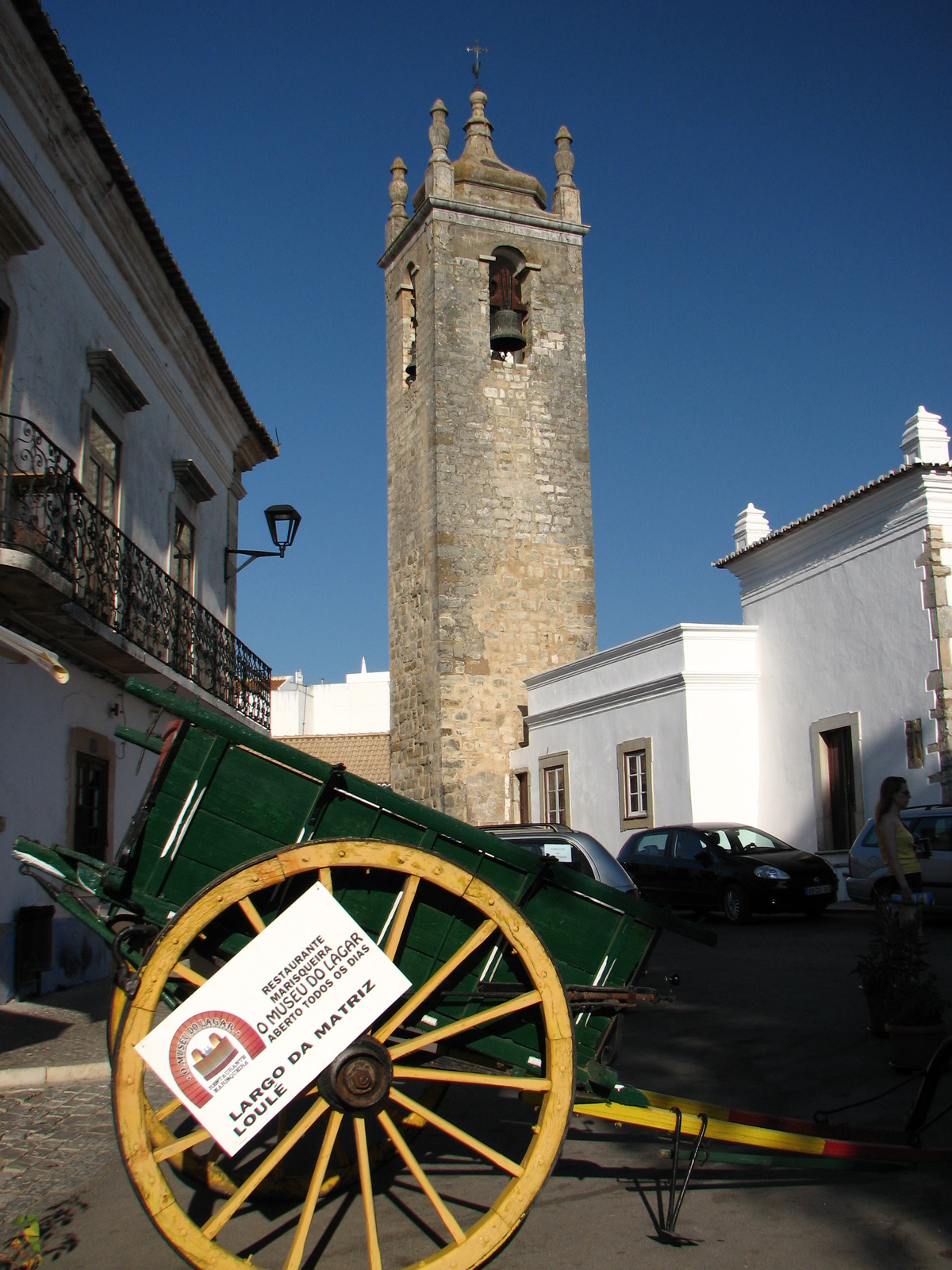
Church belfry, the original minaret of a former mosque.

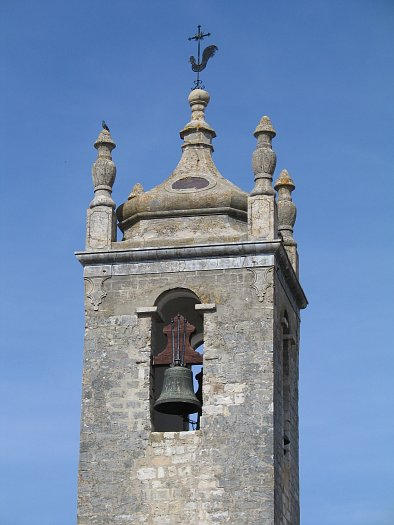
Closer look of the bell tower, one of few surviving original minaret in Portugal.

== Historical buildings ==
- Castle of Loulé,
- National Monument of Portugal

== See also ==
- List of former mosques in Portugal
