= Igreja de Santa Maria de Marvila =

Church in Portugal

Coordinates: 39.2351987°N 8.6813888°W

Igreja de Santa Maria de Marvila is a church in Portugal. It is classified as a National Monument.

This church is believed to have been rebuilt on the foundations of an old mosque in the Islamic medina of Santarém after the Christian Reconquista.

== Gallery ==
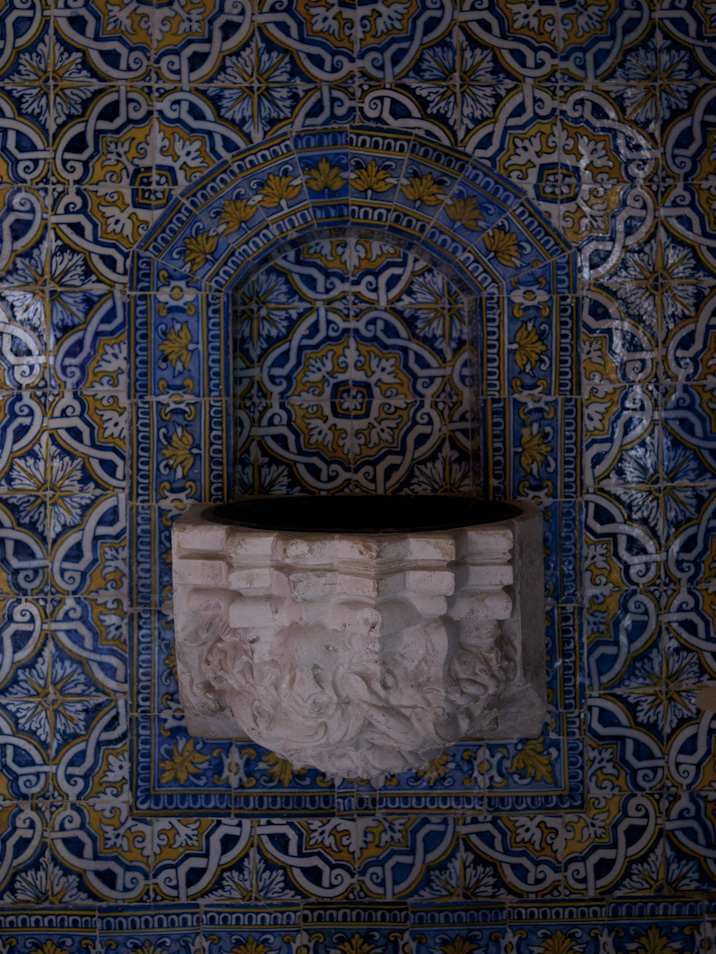
A holy water font inside the church.

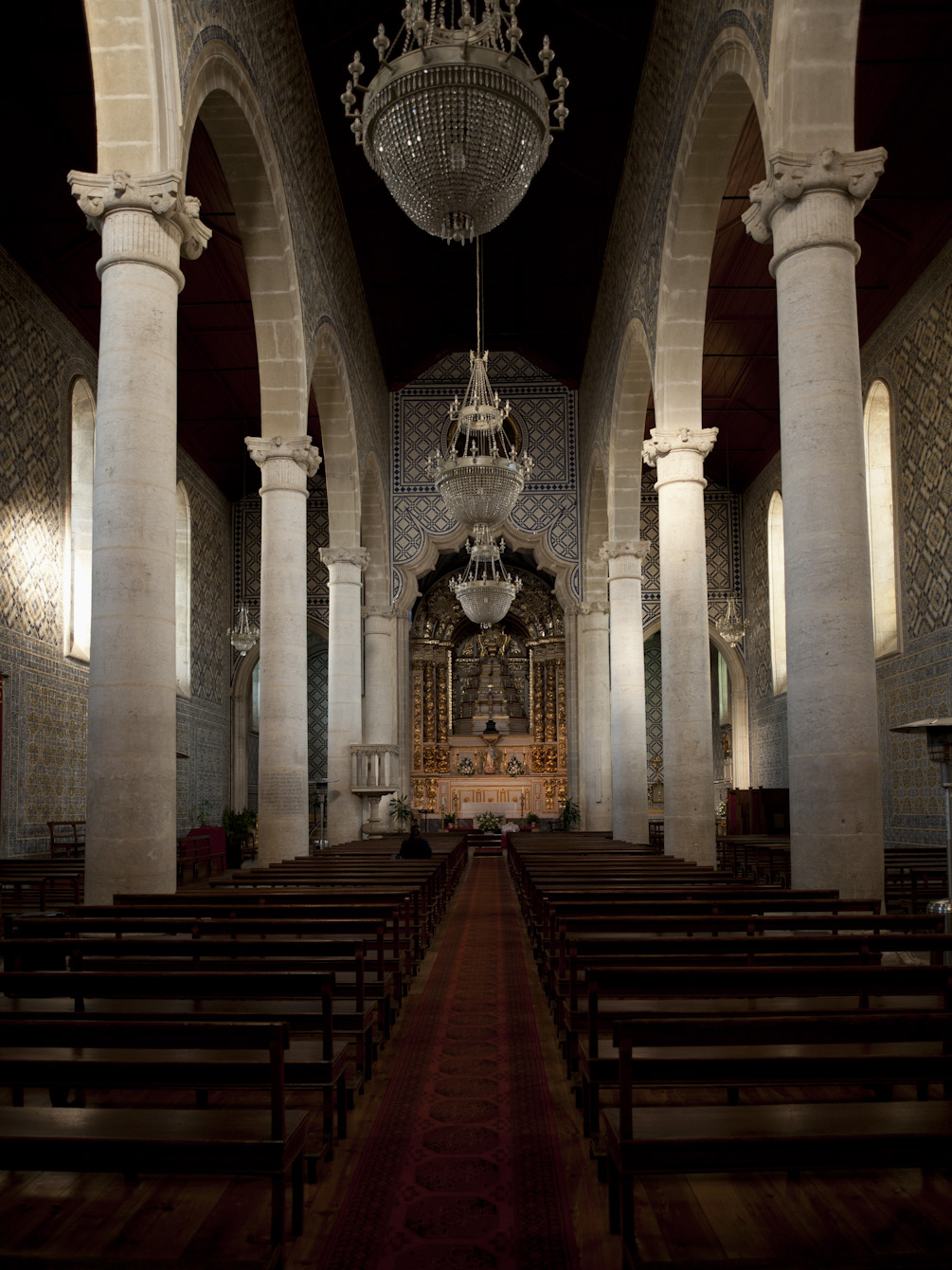
The church interior.

== See also ==
- List of former mosques in Portugal
