= Ameixial =

- Civil parish
- Location in Portugal
- Coordinates: 37.363°N 7.962°W
- Country: Portugal
- Region: Algarve
- Intermunic. comm.: Algarve
- District: Faro
- Municipality: Loulé

Area
  - Total: 123.85 km^{2} (47.82 sq mi)

Population (2011)
  - Total: 439
  - Density: 3.54/km^{2} (9.18/sq mi)
- Time zone: UTC+00:00 (WET)
  - Summer (DST): UTC+01:00 (WEST)

Ameixial is a Portuguese freguesia ("civil parish"), in the municipality of Loulé. The population in 2011 was 439, in an area of 123.85 km². It has an altitude of 439 m (1443 ft).

Climate data for Ameixial, 1941-1991 normals, 1943-1962 precipitation & humidity
Month	Jan	Feb	Mar	Apr	May	Jun	Jul	Aug	Sep	Oct	Nov	Dec	Year
Mean daily maximum °C (°F)	13.3 (55.9)	15.0 (59.0)	16.8 (62.2)	19.3 (66.7)	23.0 (73.4)	28.3 (82.9)	32.4 (90.3)	31.8 (89.2)	28.6 (83.5)	22.7 (72.9)	17.5 (63.5)	14.2 (57.6)	21.9 (71.4)
Daily mean °C (°F)	9.1 (48.4)	10.2 (50.4)	12.2 (54.0)	14.1 (57.4)	17.0 (62.6)	21.1 (70.0)	24.2 (75.6)	24.0 (75.2)	21.8 (71.2)	17.4 (63.3)	12.9 (55.2)	10.0 (50.0)	16.2 (61.1)
Mean daily minimum °C (°F)	4.8 (40.6)	5.5 (41.9)	7.6 (45.7)	8.9 (48.0)	10.9 (51.6)	13.9 (57.0)	16.1 (61.0)	16.1 (61.0)	14.9 (58.8)	12.0 (53.6)	8.3 (46.9)	5.8 (42.4)	10.4 (50.7)
Average precipitation mm (inches)	56 (2.2)	49 (1.9)	77 (3.0)	35 (1.4)	35 (1.4)	15 (0.6)	1 (0.0)	1 (0.0)	22 (0.9)	49 (1.9)	59 (2.3)	73 (2.9)	472 (18.5)
Average relative humidity (%)	83	79	74	62	57.5	47	42.5	44.5	52.5	67.5	79	85	64.5
Source: IPMA
