= Church of Nossa Senhora da Anunciação =

- Church of Our Lady of the Annunciation
- Igreja de Nossa Senhora da Anuncição
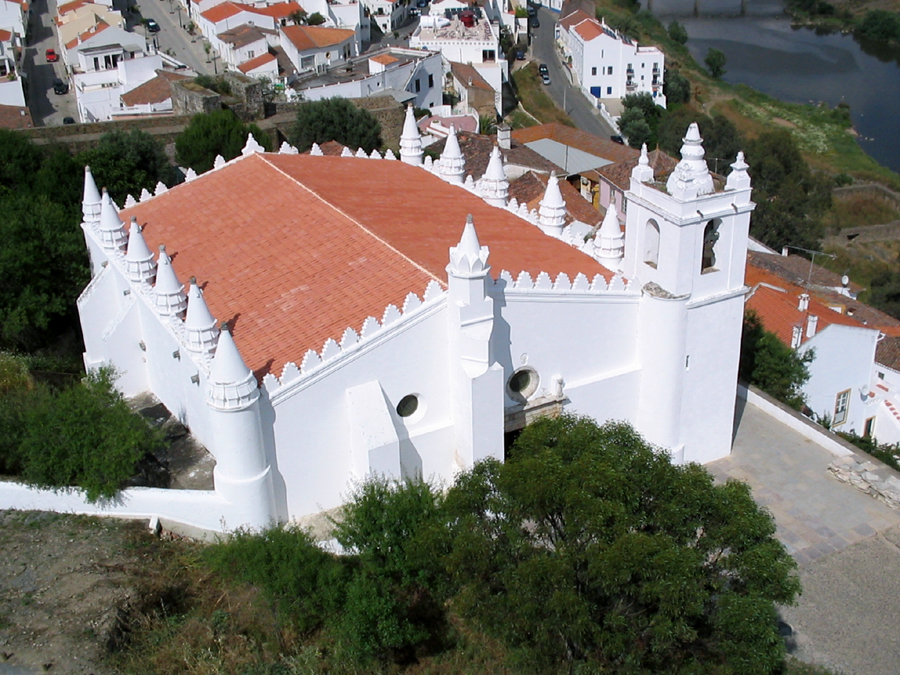
- The mixed-architecture parochial church of Mértola

- Location of the church in the municipality of Mértola Church of Nossa Senhora da Anunciação (Europe)
- 37°38′18″N 7°39′49″W
- Location: Beja, Baixo Alentejo, Alentejo
- Country: Portugal

Architecture
- Architect(s): André Pillarte, Fernão Pires
- Style: Islamic, Gothic, Manueline, Renaissance

The Church of Nossa Senhora da Anunciação (Portuguese: Igreja Paroquial de Mértola/Igreja de Nossa Senhora da Assunção/Igreja de Nossa Senhora da Anunciação) is a 12th-century church and former mosque in the civil parish of Mértola in the municipality of Mértola, in the Portuguese Alentejo.

== History ==
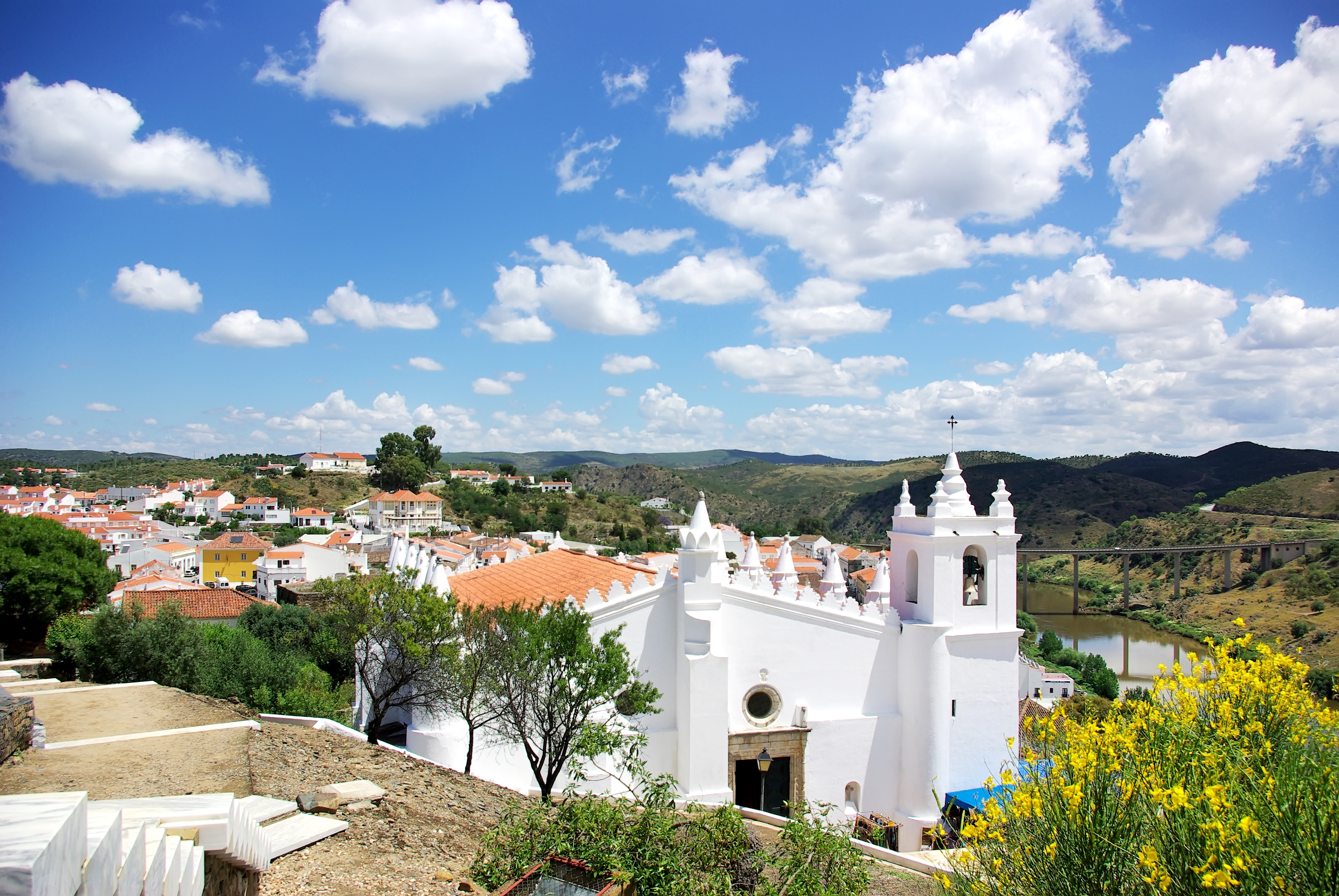
A view of the church on the hilltop with the skyline of Mértola

The building was likely built at the end of the 12th century as a mosque.

But, by the 13th century, the building had already become transformed into a Christian church, and its altar relocated to the northern wall. It was re-installed in the east sometime at the end of the 15th century.

In 1506, Duarte de Armas represented the church with a timber roof truss and a minaret/tower.

By the middle of the 16th century, though, Pedro Dias described the changes to the building: the minaret had already been substituted for a belltower and the roofline had become adorned with merlons, which crown the roof of the building (authored by Fernão Pires).

Between the 17th and 18th century, the belltower was redecorated.

On 2 February 1969, the region experienced an earthquake resulting in damage to buildings on the hilltop, including the church.

== Architecture ==
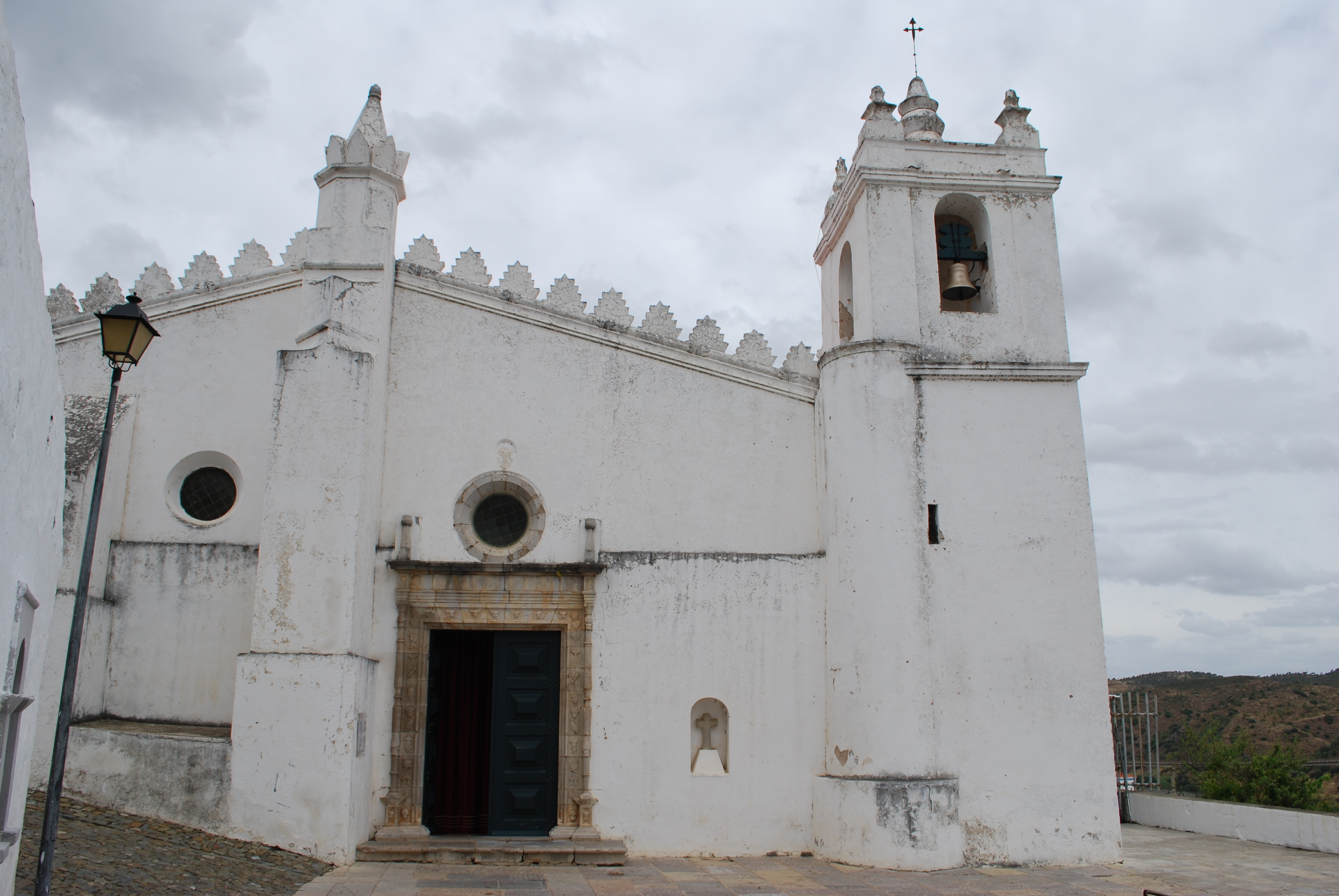
The principal facade showing a mix of elements

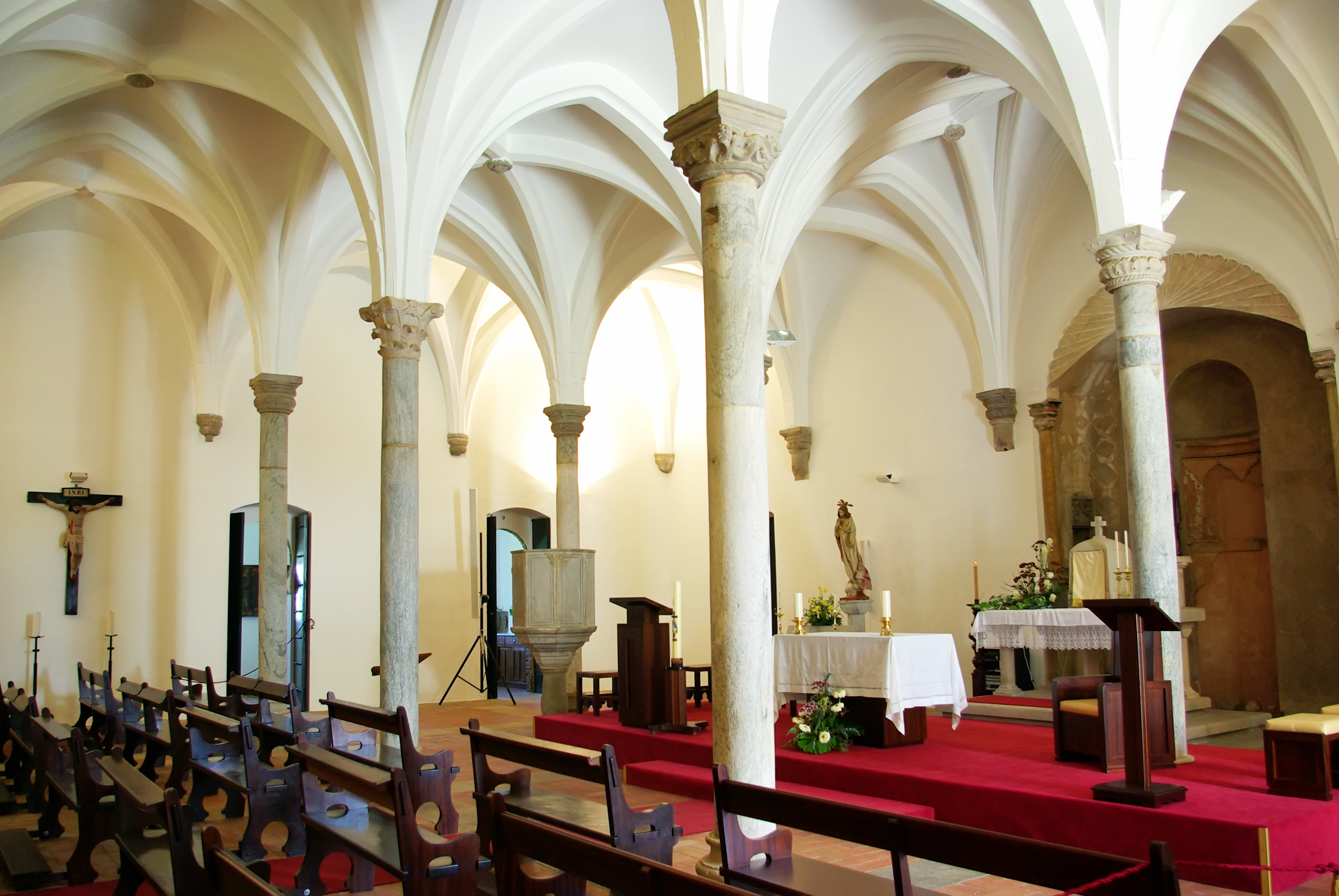
The characteristic interior with the vaulted ceiling and pillars typical of Islamic architecture, juxtapositioned with Christian elements

The church is located on an isolated hilltop, implanted on the steep slopes below the Castle of Mértola, but dominating the northern aspect of the town, on terraces above the Guadiana River. Its principal facade is situated along a roadway delimited by wall across (PT040209040017), and nearby the Chapel of Calvário.

The plan consists of a large, rectangular nave, rectangular annex (in the north), a pentagonal mihrab (in the east) and a square bell tower (in the southeast) all covered in differentiated tile roof. The four facades are crowned by triangular staccato merlons, alternating along the lateral walls with conical pinnacles and chamfered merlons. The principal facade, oriented on an angle to the south, one of the pinnacles acts as decoration and cylindrical buttress (in the left corner), adjoining the prismatic bell tower with windows in the upper section and fogaréus in the four corners.

Attached to the middle axis of the facade, is a three-storey buttress of differing molding that ends in a conical pinnacle. To its right, in decentered position, is a rectangular portico framed by low relief and colonnades, surmounted by molded oculus. On the rear facade, is a prismatic annex and an oblique archway portal framed by alfiz. On the right lateral facade is the faceted volume of the mihrab. Several buttresses reinforce the main elevation and the lateral elevations, one of them disposed in a diagonal, another flying buttress.

=== Interior ===
The interior consists of five naves, divided into four sections (with a central nave) and the last wider section forming a "T", covered by ogive/cross vaults on cylindrical column/shafts and corbels attached to the walls. The section in front of the mihrab/main altar is covered by vault with stars. A rounded archway/niche on columns into the eastern wall, framing the niche-shaped mihrab, with polylobal, stucco blind arches and the nimbar. Four doors under vaulted archways are framed by alfizes, one open in the east and three to the north.

== See also ==
- List of former mosques in Portugal
