= Arrifana (Aljezur) =

Village in Algarve, Portugal

- Village and parish
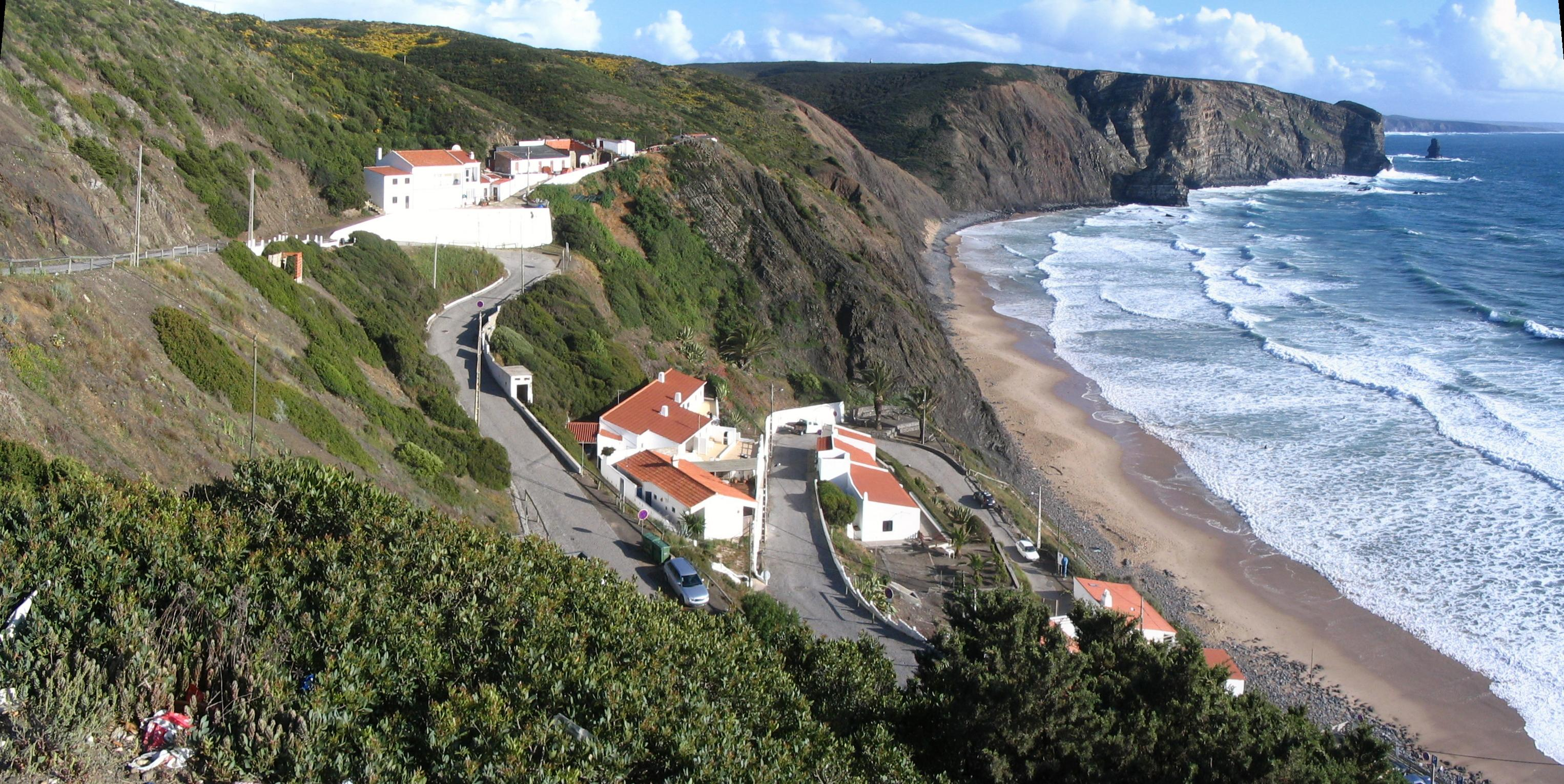
- Praia da Arrifana with the Needle Stone visible in the top right corner
- Etymology: Arabic
- Interactive map of Arrifana
- Coordinates: 37.2941°N 8.8639°E
- Country: Portugal
- Time zone: GMT
- Postal code: 8670-111

Arrifana (Portuguese pronunciation: [ɐʁiˈfɐnɐ]) is a small parish and fishing village in the Faro District's Aljezur Municipality in the Barlavento Algarvio region of Portugal. It is situated near the border between the Aljezur and Alentejo regions on the coast of the Atlantic Ocean and is within the Costa Vicentina park. Arrifana is located about 6 km from Aljezur.

== Etymology ==
Many names in the Algarve region have Arabic influences leftover from the Moorish presence in Iberia. Arrifana, from the Arabic word Arihana, means myrtle, a plant that grows in the area.

== Village life ==
=== Cuisine ===
As a fishing village, Arrifana enjoys seafood as a main part of its cuisine; its regional specialty is the barnacle, particularly the Goose barnacle, referred to as percebes. Due to the difficulty of reaching barnacle populations, which live where the surf meets the rocks, the Portuguese consider barnacle harvesting among the most dangerous jobs in the world. Other dishes include octopus in olive oil, fish stew, fried Moray eels, and octopus with sweet potatoes.

=== Festivals ===
Since 2005, Arrifana has been home to the Arrifana Sunset Festival, which features live music and craft and food stalls, and takes places along the Arrifana Beach. Previous musical performances include Gabriel o Pensador, Reeps One, Mishka, Tiago Bettencourt, True Vibenation, Caravana Sun, Ben Howard, and Peyoti for President. Music genres include reggae, rock, hip-hop, ska, funk, and electronic music. The festival has an overall focus on environmental responsibility and several small activities take place during the event, including cleaning the beach and making reusable items such as mugs. The event takes place in late July and is hosted by the Arrifana Fisherman's Association.

The Arrifana Fisherman's Festival (Festival dos Pescadores da Arrifana) takes place during the last Saturday in July, with the Arrifana Sunset Festival on the following day. This event features blessing of fishing boats for the coming harvest, live concerts, and fresh seafood.

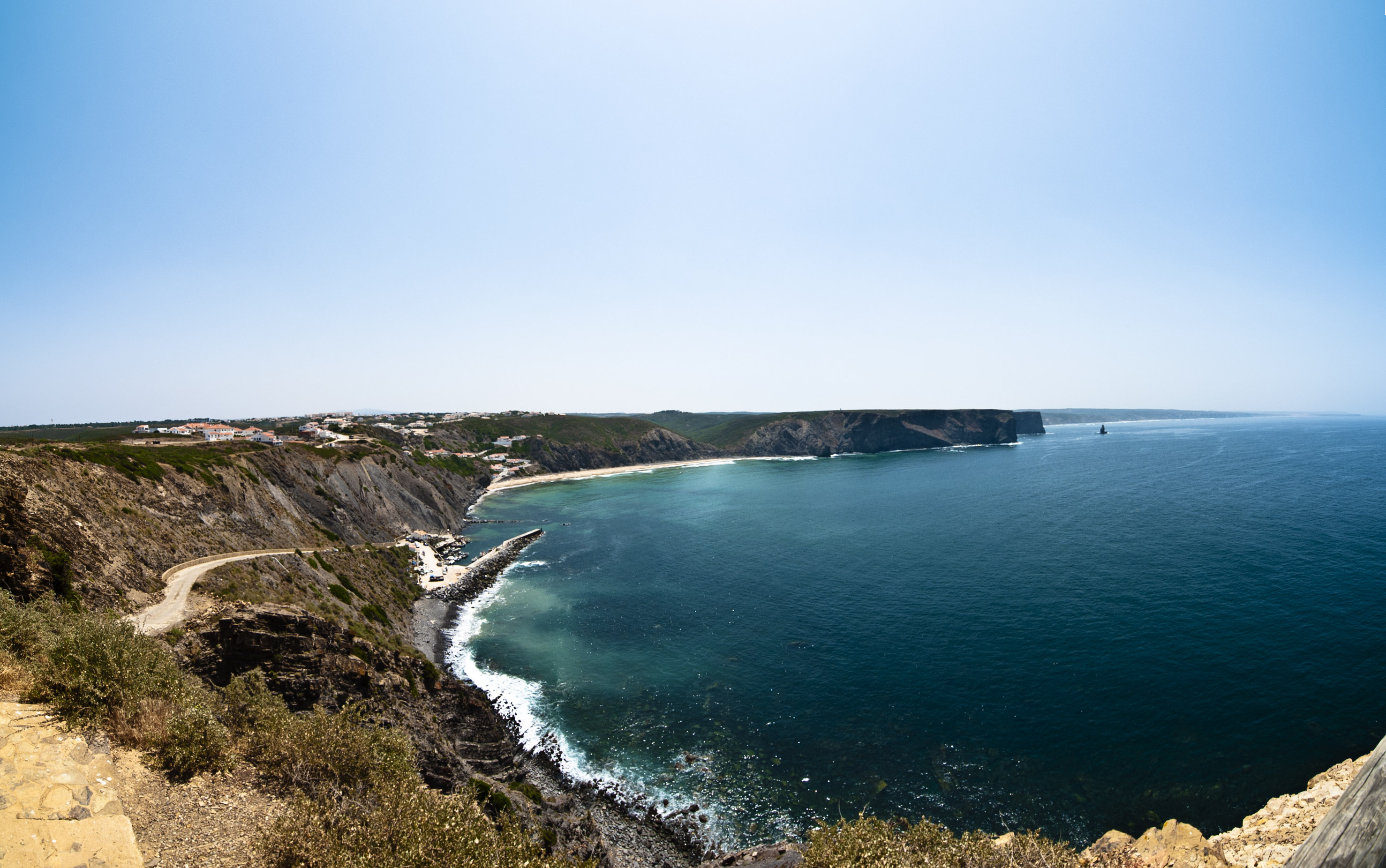
A panoramic view of Praia da Arrifano

=== Points of interest ===
==== Rota Vicentina ====
Rota Vicentina is a mapped trail with two routes, one of which is the Historical Way, which crosses through Arrifana and has twice (2016 and 2020) been certified with the "Leading Quality Trails—Best of Europe" label. The trail is 263 km long and consists of thirteen legs each up to 25 km long . Arrifana is the stop between Carrapateira, a neighboring village, and Aljezur. The other route, the Fisherman's Trail (Trilho dos Pescadores) is a more difficult route from Porto Covo to Cabo de São Vicente.

==== Praia da Arrifana ====
Praia da Arrifana is a seashell-shaped Blue Flag beach on the Atlantic Ocean Sandstone cliffs surround the beach and cut the worst of the wind, which creates ideal conditions for scuba-diving and surfing, since the waves are not as high as neighboring beaches nor as strong. The beach rents out wetsuits, surfboards, and bodyboards and surfing lessons are available on-site. It is the location of the annual Sunset Fest and Fisherman's Festival and has hosted several regional surfing competitions. The fishing port lies at the north end of the beach, and the Needle Stone (Pedra da Agulha) is visible from the south end.

==== Ribât de Arrifana ====
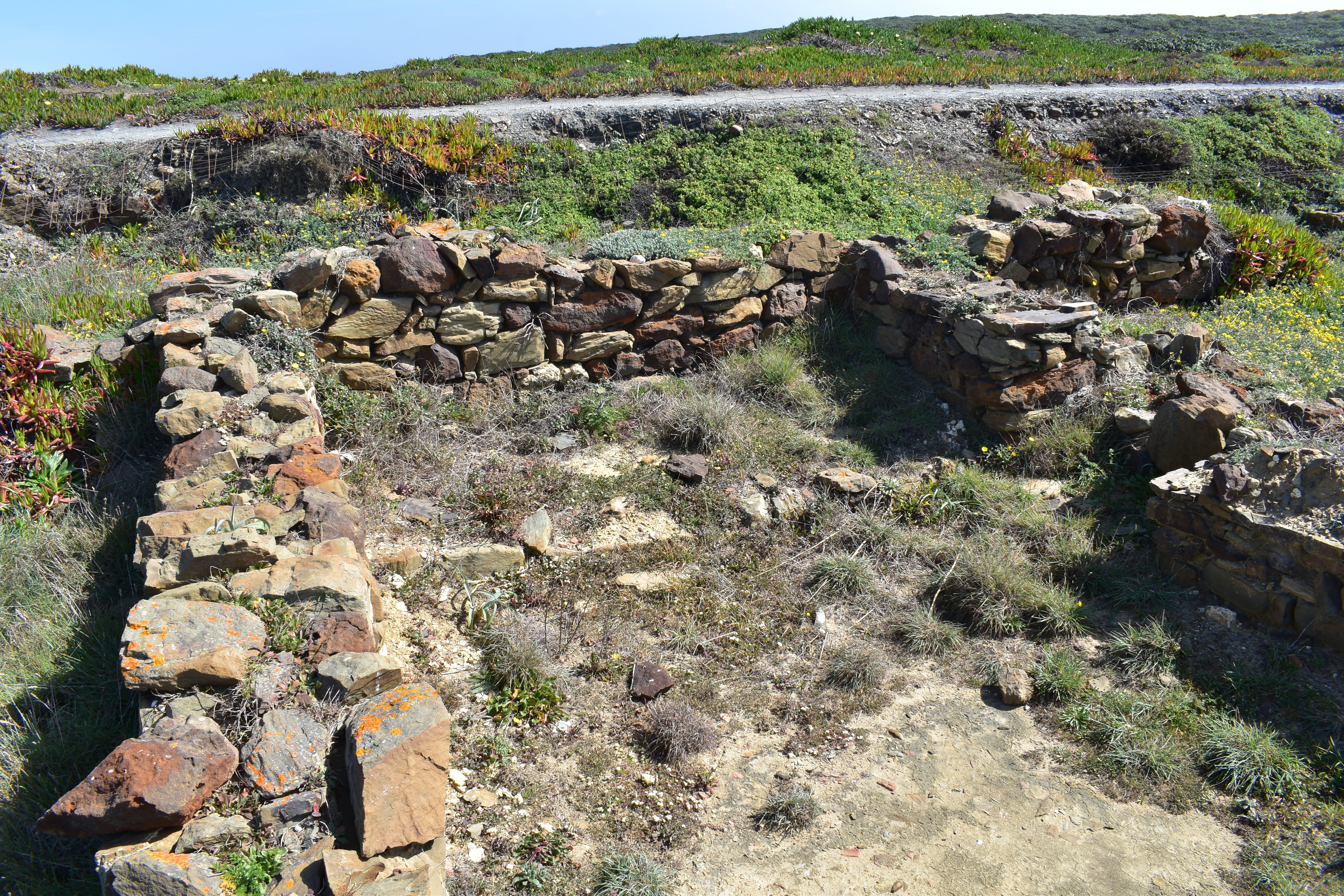
Ribât de Arrifana ruins

The Ribât de Arrifana is a 12th-century Moorish fortress just north of Arrifana. It is thought to have been built at the beginning of Ibn Qasi's push for the spread of Sufism in Gharb al-Andalus, now known as Iberia, and likely housed warrior monks who aimed to defend Sufism, of which a core principle is universal love. The fortress was likely abandoned around 1151 upon the assassination of Ibn Qasi. Use from other groups, perhaps as a defense against pirates, fluctuated throughout the years; it was damaged multiple times, including by the 1755 Lisbon earthquake, and finally abandoned altogether by the 19th century. In 2001, it was rediscovered by archaeologists. These excavations uncovered mosques, a minaret, a madrasa, a necropolis, and a prayer wall facing the religious site of Mecca. Scholars of medieval Islam's control of and lasting influence in Europe regard the Ribât as "one of the most important archaeological discoveries of the 21st century." In 2007, Aljezur did minor renovations that made it safe enough to accommodate visitors; the Ribât was then made a national monument in 2013.

In 2021, José Gonçalves, mayor of Aljezur, signed into action a plan that would make the Ribât de Arrifana an archaeological site. Funding for the current development and future projects comes in part from the Aga Khan Foundation, an organization affiliated with Islam. The center is expected to open in 2025.
