= Ribat of Arrifana =

12th-century coastal fortress in Portugal

- Ribat da Arrifana
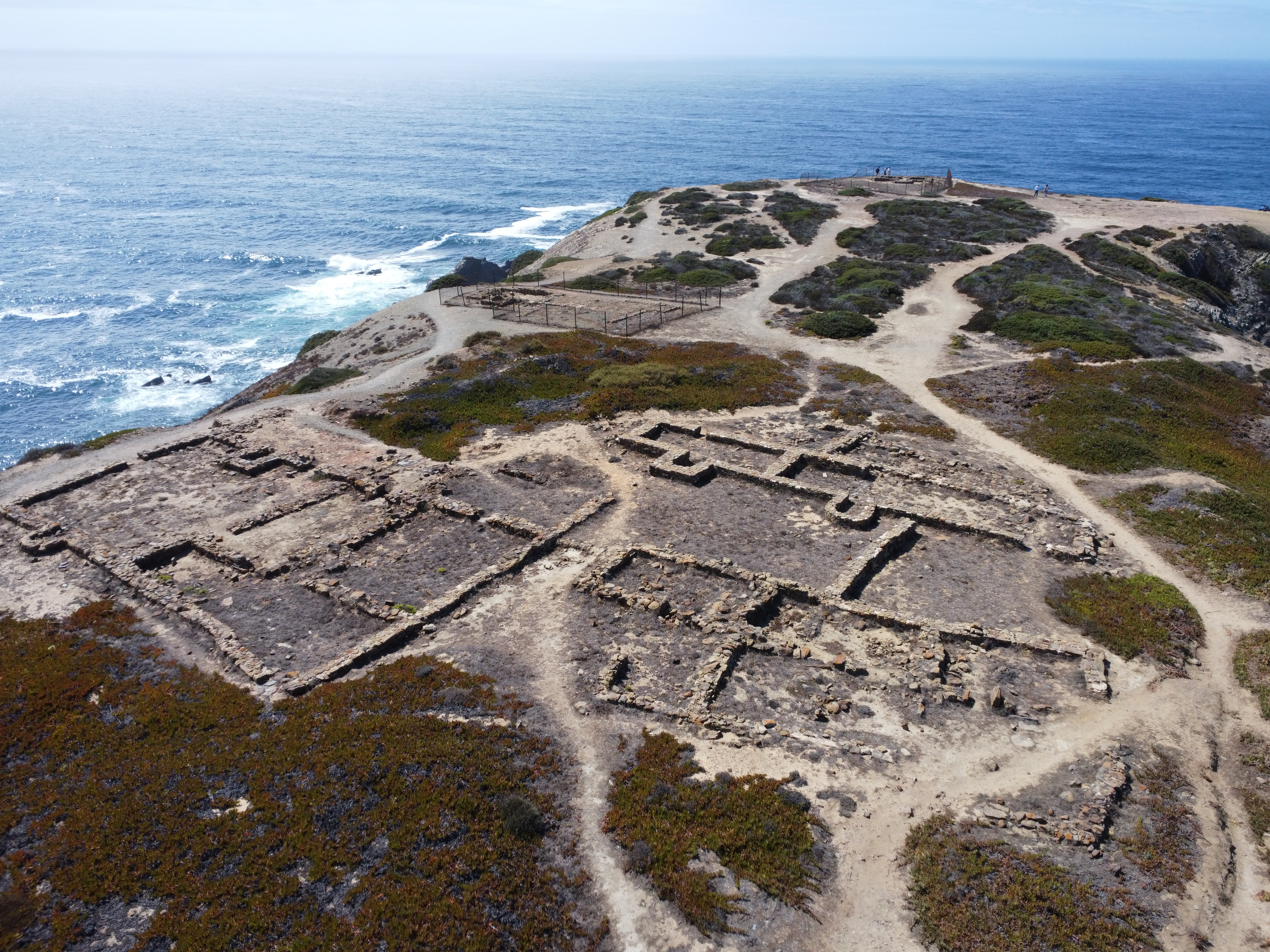
- Aerial view of Ribat of Arrifana
- Interactive map of Ribat of Arrifana
- 37°19′14″N 8°52′37″W
- Type: Excavations
- Cultures: Andalusī
- Location: Aljezur, Faro (district), Algarve, Portugal

History
- Built: 1130
- Abandoned: 1151

Site notes
- Excavation dates: since 2001
- Archaeologists: Rosa Varela Gomes and Mário Varela Gomes
- Owner: Private
- Public access: Yes

The Ribat of Arrifana is the archeological site of the remains of a Muslim fortification (ribat) situated in Arrifana, Aljezur municipality, in the Faro District of the Algarve region, Portugal. It was a Muslim coastal fortress built around 1130 and is the only such Muslim fortress to have been identified in Portugal, having been excavated by Portuguese archaeologists since 2001.

== History ==
The ribat is located on the Ponta da Atalaia, about 1 km north of Arrifana Beach. It was constructed around 1130, probably by the Sufi and Mahdi master of Christian origin, Abūʾl-Qāsim Aḥmad ibn al-Ḥusayn ibn Qasī, one of the leading political and religious figures in al-Andalus, the Muslim territory that covered most of Iberia during the Islamic Golden Age. Between 1130 and 1140 Ibn Qasi wrote his main work, The Removal of the Sandals, which was inspired by both the Old Testament and the Quran. In 1151 he was assassinated in Silves after being accused of betraying Islam by the followers of Abd al-Mu'min and Ibn Almúndir. After this the Ribat of Arrifana was abandoned, with the English crusader and chronicler, Roger of Hoveden, reporting forty years later that it was “recognizable but in ruins”. It is believed that the minaret was used as a watchtower in the fourteenth century. Despite appearing in written records dating back to 1786 and being clearly identifiable as a former inhabited area as late as 1841, the location of the ribat was only identified by archaeologists at the beginning of this millennium. Its architectural features are inspired by the ribats identified in North Africa.

== Excavations ==
In addition to protection against invaders the ribat was dedicated to prayer, containing eight mosques with qibla and mihrab oratories where warrior monks prayed, as well as a minaret, a madrasa and accommodation. These structures were built in mud on stone foundations, with floors mostly of beaten earth, with wood coverings and straw roof tiles. A building located in the north-eastern part of the necropolis provided a bench, storage for water, and a basin dug in the soil. The floor and walls were well-coated with lime. Excavations by the Faculty of Social and Human Sciences of the New University of Lisbon have identified decorated amulets, remains of tableware and kitchenware, as well as pottery for storage. Brass items used for weaving, such as a spindle, have also been found, together with iron weapons, including a dagger, a sword, a spear, and arrowheads. Items related to fishing and mollusc harvesting have also been identified. A long fragment of bone is believed to have been part of a musical instrument.

Also found partially within the confines of the ribat was a necropolis. Sixty-one graves have been discovered orientated northeast-southwest, indicating the burial of the corpses with the face turned towards Mecca. Some graves assumed to be Christian were also identified. Text found on some of the gravestones or stele predated the construction of the ribat and it is unclear whether the epitaphs were ‘’’in situ’’’ at the site when the Ribat of Arrifana was built, whether they were transferred from a small village nearby, or whether the stones were simply reused. The corpses were buried in pits with their arms gathered tightly to their abdomen and legs slightly bent. Of the corpses examined, no signs of violence were detected as a cause of death, nor severe bone trauma or infections. Dental caries constituted the most common pathology. There was also considerable evidence of anemia.

Logistical and financial support for the excavation work was provided by Aljezur municipality, the Calouste Gulbenkian Foundation and the Max van Berchem Foundation.

== See also ==
- List of former mosques in Portugal
