= Vítor Aleixo =

Portuguese politician (born 1956)

Vítor Aleixo (born February 7, 1956, in Loulé) is the current mayor of Loulé, Portugal.

He was born on February 7, 1956, in Loulé, Portugal. Throughout his career, he has been involved in local and regional politics, as well as in a variety of business related activities. He is a member of the Portuguese Socialist Party, and is well known for his commitment to the development of his hometown.
