= Praia da Arrifana =

Portuguese beach

- Beach
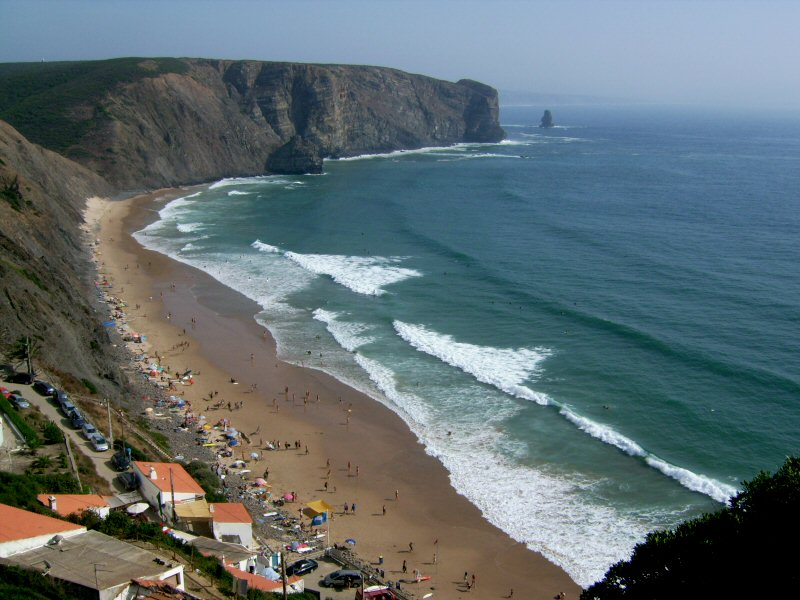
- Location of Praia da Arrifana in Portugal

- Coordinates: 37°17′34″N 8°51′54″W
- Location: Aljezur, Portugal

Praia da Arrifana is a beach within the Municipality of Aljezur, in the Algarve, Portugal. The beach is on the western Seaboard in the north west of the Algarve. The beach is 6.0 miles (9.7 km) south south west of the village of Aljezur, and is 71.0 miles (114.3 km) north west, by road, from the regions capital of Faro. The beach of Praia da Arrifana is inside the Vicentine Coast Natural Park, an area of outstanding natural beauty. Praia da Arrifana has been designated a blue Flag beach (2012).

== Description ==
The sand on Praia da Arrifana is of pale golden fine sand and is approximately 500 meters long. The beach is backed by tall cliffs which afford the beach some protection from the ravages of the Atlantic Ocean. Even so, this is a very popular beach for surfing and body surfing. The beach is accessed by a boardwalk steps, down to the beach from the village. At the bottom of the village, there is a concrete slope which provides easy access for wheelchair users and for boats etc. On the northwest side of the bay, there is the small fishing village of Arrifana and its small fishing harbour.

=== Castle Arrifana ruins ===
On the northern headland above the beach are the ruins of Castle Arrifana (Information Leaflet). The 12th-century ruins are thought to once have been the residence of Abu-l-Qasim Ahmad ibn al-Husayn ibn Qasi who was a prince of the first independent Kingdom of Algarve. The prince came to this fortification away from the then capital of Silves to devote himself to writing, thought and contemplation. Recent archaeological research has discovered the ruins of several buildings on this site in two areas. The buildings discovered include three mosques, with their Qibla and Mihrab. In the first area, there are the remains of a mosque with another adjoining mosque. In the second area are further structures of unknown use.

== Facilities ==
During the summer season, the beach is patrolled by lifeguards. There are toilets and showers close to the car park. There is also a public telephone. In the village Arrifana there are several restaurants and bars, such as Restaurante Oceano, O Paulo, Brisamar, Restaurant Praia Arrifana Restaurant Fortaleza.

== Getting there ==
From the town of Lagos take the RN 120 road north towards Sines, Just before the village of Aljezur turn left, signposted to Vale da Telha, Praia do monte Clérigo and a brown sign posted to Praia da Arrifana. At the top of the hill turn left and follow the road round to the Praia da Arrifana.

== Gallery ==
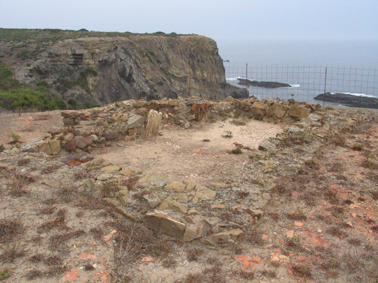
Castle Arrifana

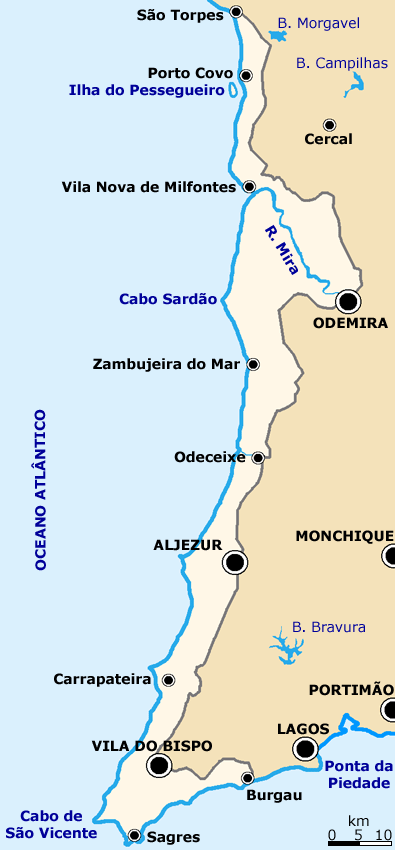
Map of the Vicentine Coast Natural Park
