= List of former mosques in Portugal =

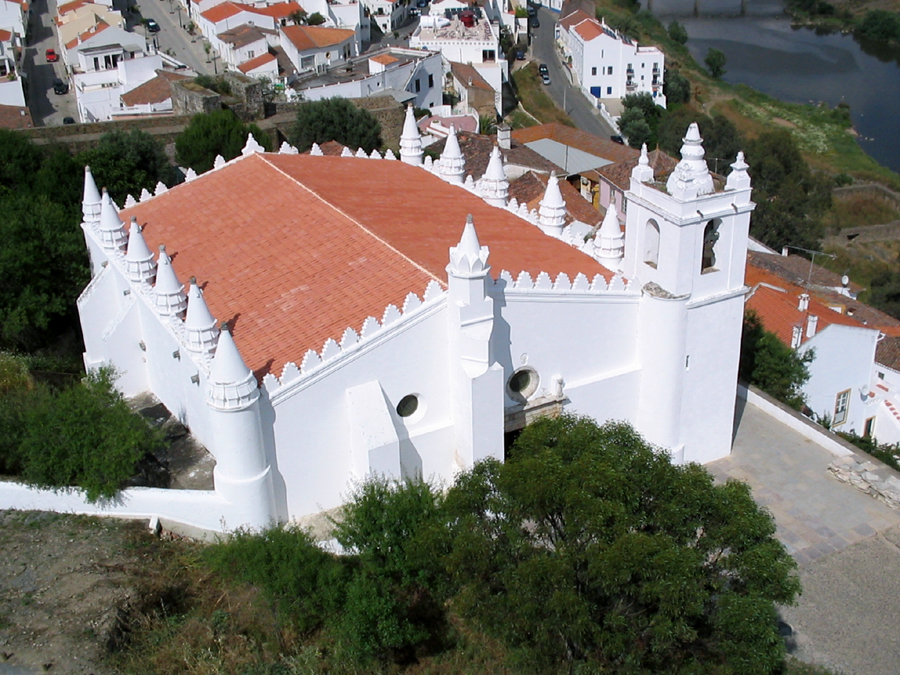
Igreja Matriz de Mértola, the uniquely preserved old mosque in Portugal.

This is a list of former mosques in Portugal in Portugal used during the Al-Andalus period (Portuguese for Mosque is: Mesquita Arabic: Masjid).

The term former mosque in this list indicates any mosque (building) or site used for Islamic Prayer (Salah) in Portugal during the Islamic occupation of the Iberian Peninsula.

Most of the former Portuguese mosques were built and used as Muslim places of worship during the Al-Andalus era when several Muslim Moorish kingdoms and empires ruled large parts of the Iberian Peninsula including most of modern Portugal. Most former mosques and Islamic religious buildings were either demolished altogether or converted into churches, after the Christian Reconquista of Iberia. This list does not include the former mosques in Spain that were built during Al-andalus period.

Mosques were important buildings during Arab rule in Portugal. They formed an important part of Moorish architecture. Portuguese mosques and religious buildings had a square plan layout. Minaret towers were normally built in a corner of the mosque. They were used for announcing the Islamic prayer call known as Adhan, five times a day. The qibla or direction the faithful should face when performing Islamic prayers (Salah) was indicated by a small niche called mihrab on the main wall. The mihrab and minaret usually projected out from the main walls of the mosque.

In some ancient mosques like the former Great mosque of Silves, water tanks or cisterns were built to store and supply water for Wudu, the washing ritual performed before prayers. Horseshoe arches were a distinctive Iberian Moor architectural feature. They were commonly used to frame doorways, windows or just as decoration in Portuguese mosques. Four horseshoe doorways which opened into an inner courtyard or Sahn, remain in Mertola mosque. Mihrabs, horseshoe arches and door frames were decorated with detailed patterns formed by intertwining lines, known as arabesques. They had patterns of geometric and floral motifs. Simple shapes, repeated in symmetrical arrays giving a beautiful artistic finish. Due to the shorter exposure to Islam and substantially quicker Portuguese Reconquista re-establishing the Christian religion and cultural values in every aspect, the minority Islamic legacy assimilated into the mainstream Portuguese and dissolved over time. Unlike neighbouring Spain where a significant number of these original mosques and religious structures are still standing, scattered more or less all over the country, there is no unmodified ancient mosque left in Portugal. The best preserved example being Mértola’s modified former mosque (turned into a church in the 12th century), and a few more structures in the South of the country.

== List of former mosques in Portugal ==
Note: Mesquita means mosque in the Portuguese language.

Location	Images	Current name	Mosque Name	Open Years	Notes	Ref.
Mértola (Alentejo)		Church of Nossa Senhora da Anunciação	Aljama mosque of Martulah	Until mid 12th century.	Best identifiable and unique former mosque in Portugal, although a mixture of Almohad and Manueline post-Gothic architecture. Mosque last rebuilt in the second half of 12th century but some elements date to the 9th century. In 1532 the church modified the mosque building reducing its size from 6 sections & 20 columns to 4 sections & 12 columns.	
Loulé (Algarve)		Church of São Clemente (Loulé)			Only some parts of the original minaret of a former mosque exists, used as church bell tower. Its 22.7 metres tall and 4.2 metres across. Church was built in 13th century and is the oldest in Loulé. Across it lies old Arab cemetery of Jardim dos Amuados. Square plan and misalignment in orientation of Church building also indicate presence of a former mosque.	
Tavira (Algarve)		Igreja de Santa Maria do Castelo (Tavira), built upon a former mosque in the 12th century.			On the location where the Church of Santa Maria stands since the 12th century, a mosque once stood at the highest point within the fortified Medina of Tavira. Recent excavations unearthed rubbish heaps with 11-12th century materials and dwellings from first half of 12th century. A slight canonical disorientation of the church is also indicative of having been built upon the basic structure of the ancient mosque. In 1718, a tomb was found with a corpse accompanied with a Moorish Alfange blade.	
Aljezur (Algarve)		Ribat of Arrifana, archaeological site			Archaeological site (CNS no. 6924) is interpreted as an ancient Islamic fortress convent warrior monks (murābitūn), founded by Ibn Qasi, in about 1130. It is a rare collection of archaeological structures with only one other being known in Iberian Peninsula, the ribat or La Rábida Friary in Spain. Remains of 8 mosques, an Islamic madrassa college, minaret and other buildings have been excavated to date.	

== See also ==
- Islam in Portugal
- List of former mosques in Spain
- Umayyad conquest of Hispania
- Reconquista
