= Loulé =

- Municipality
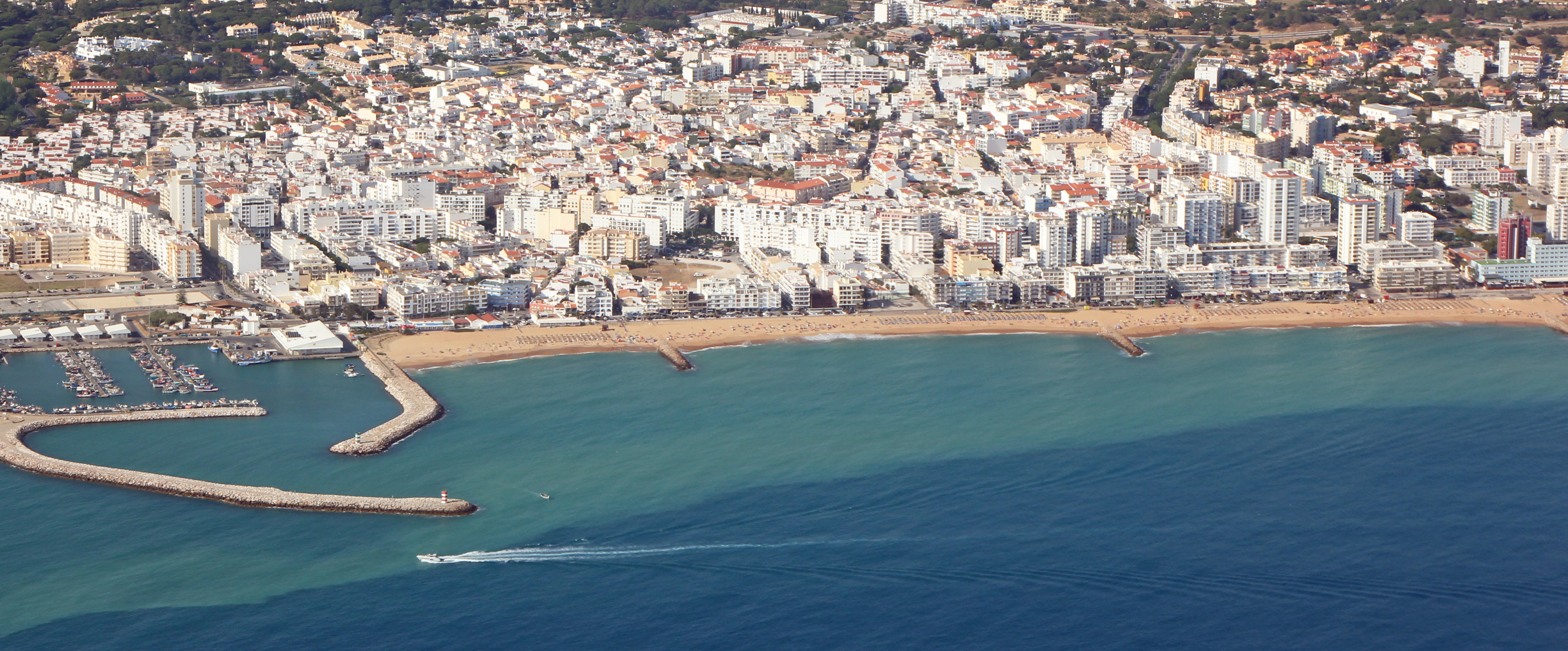
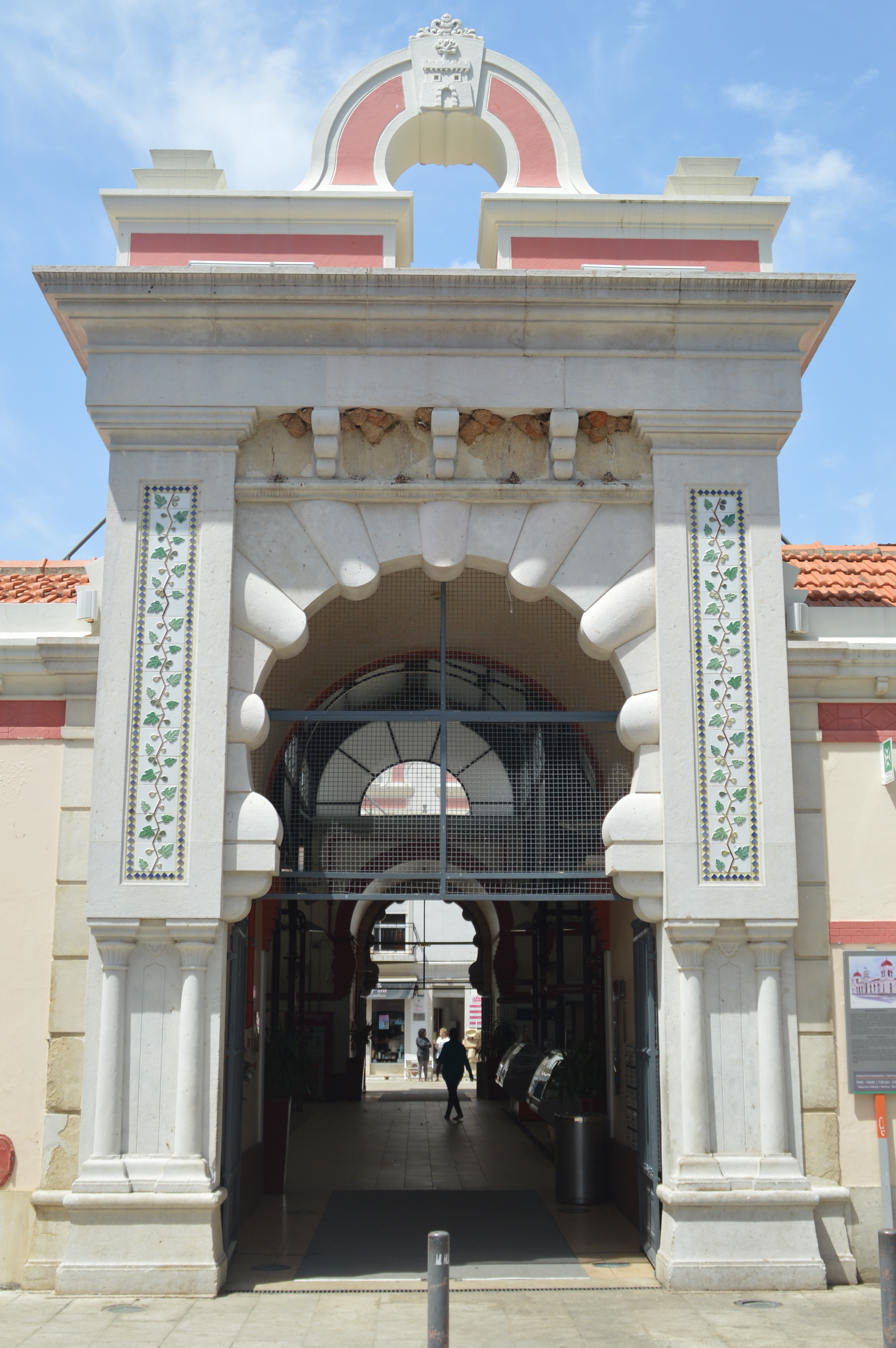
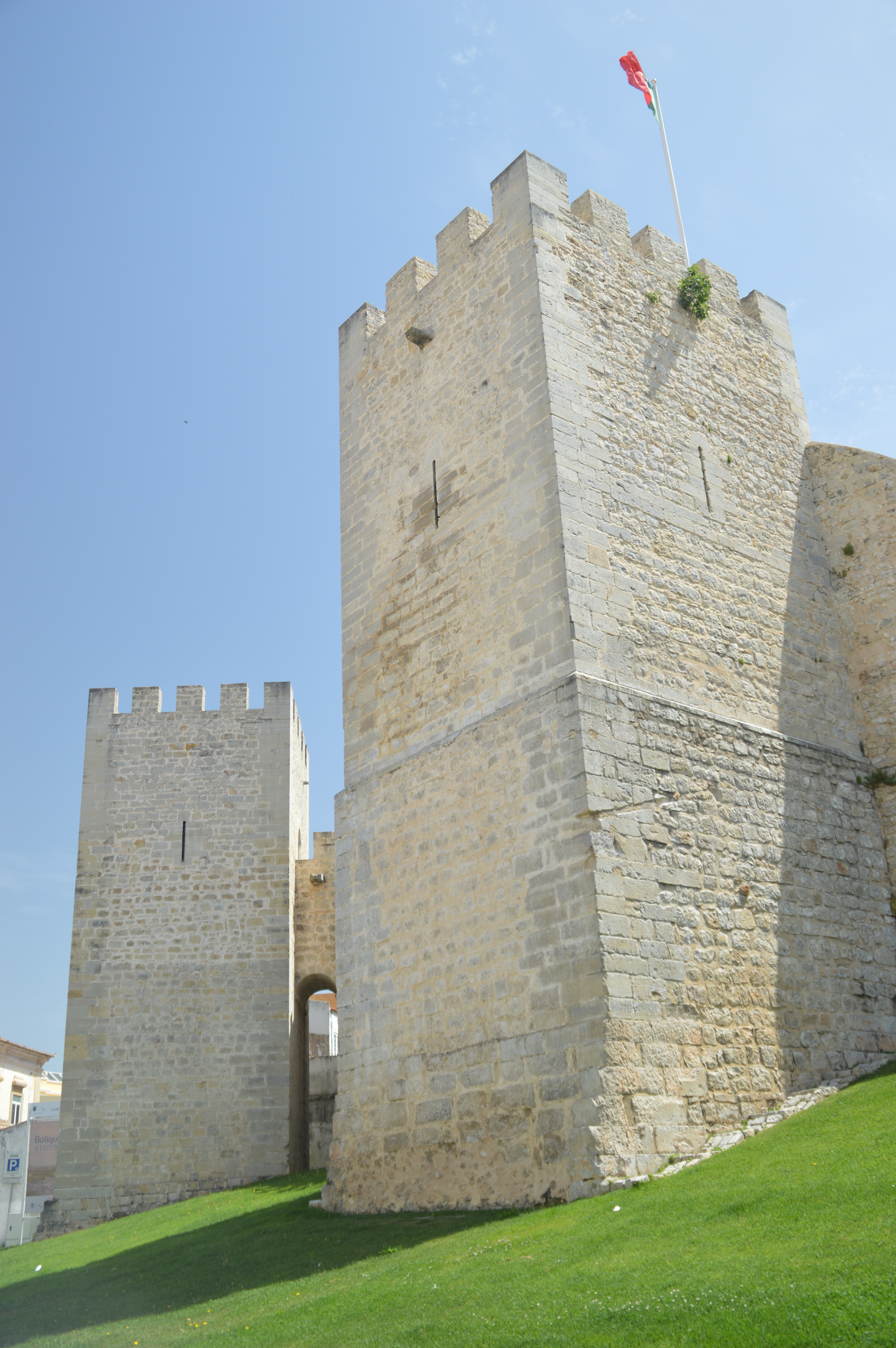
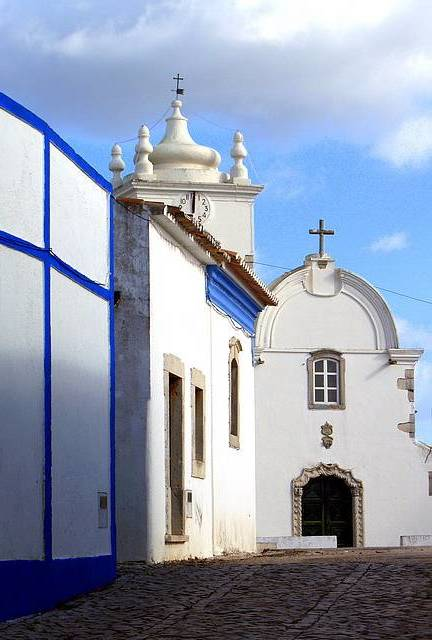
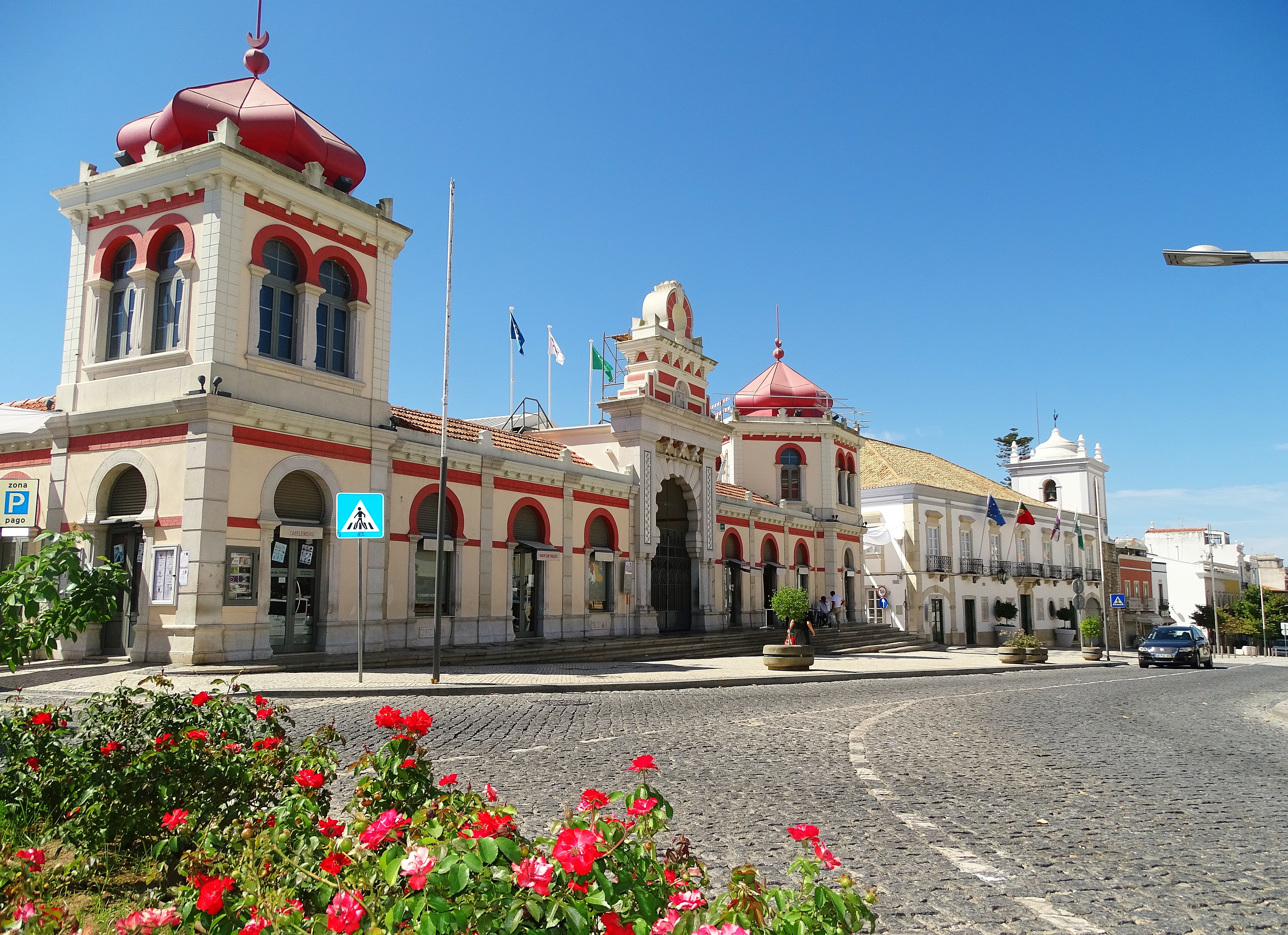
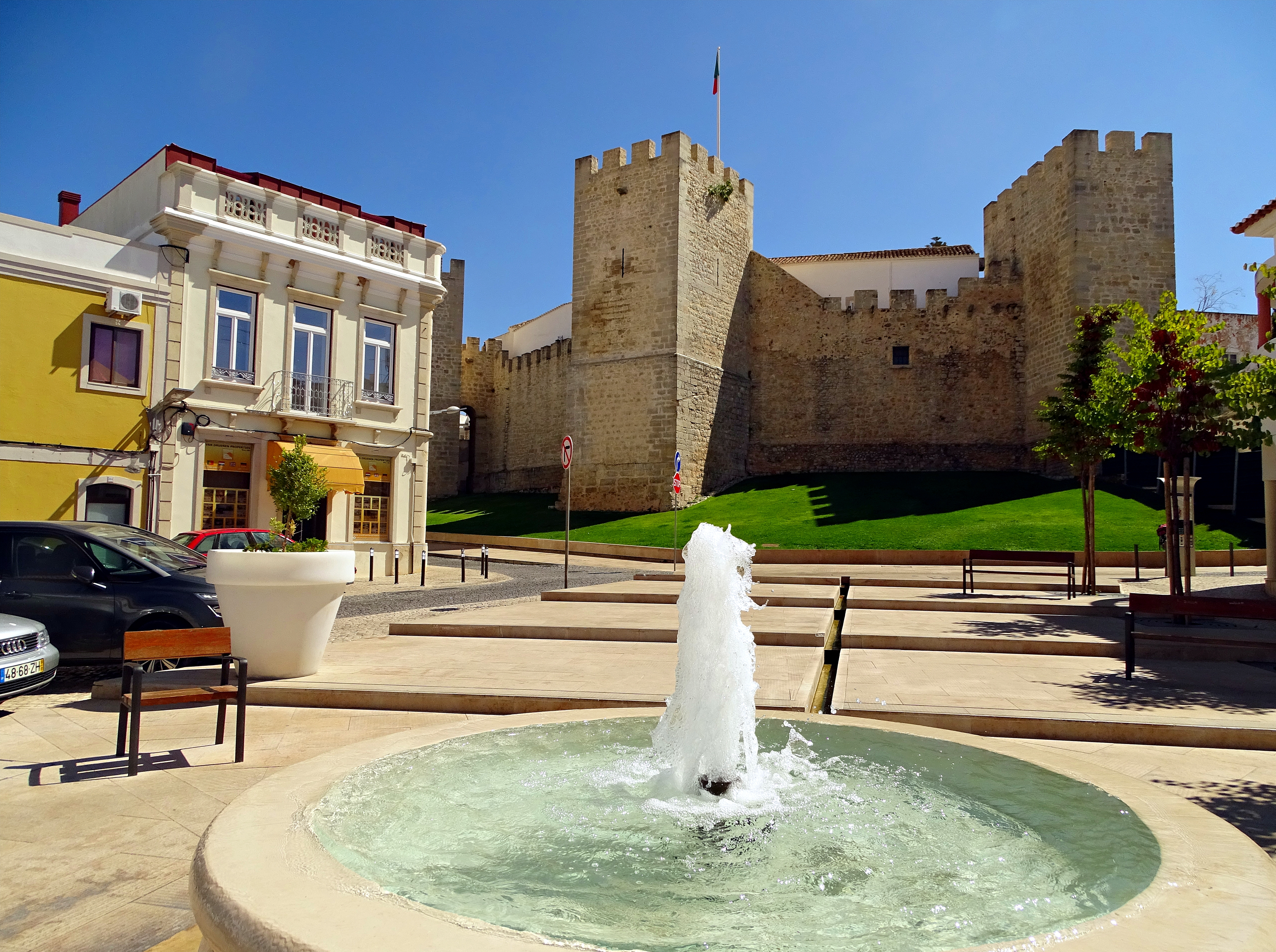
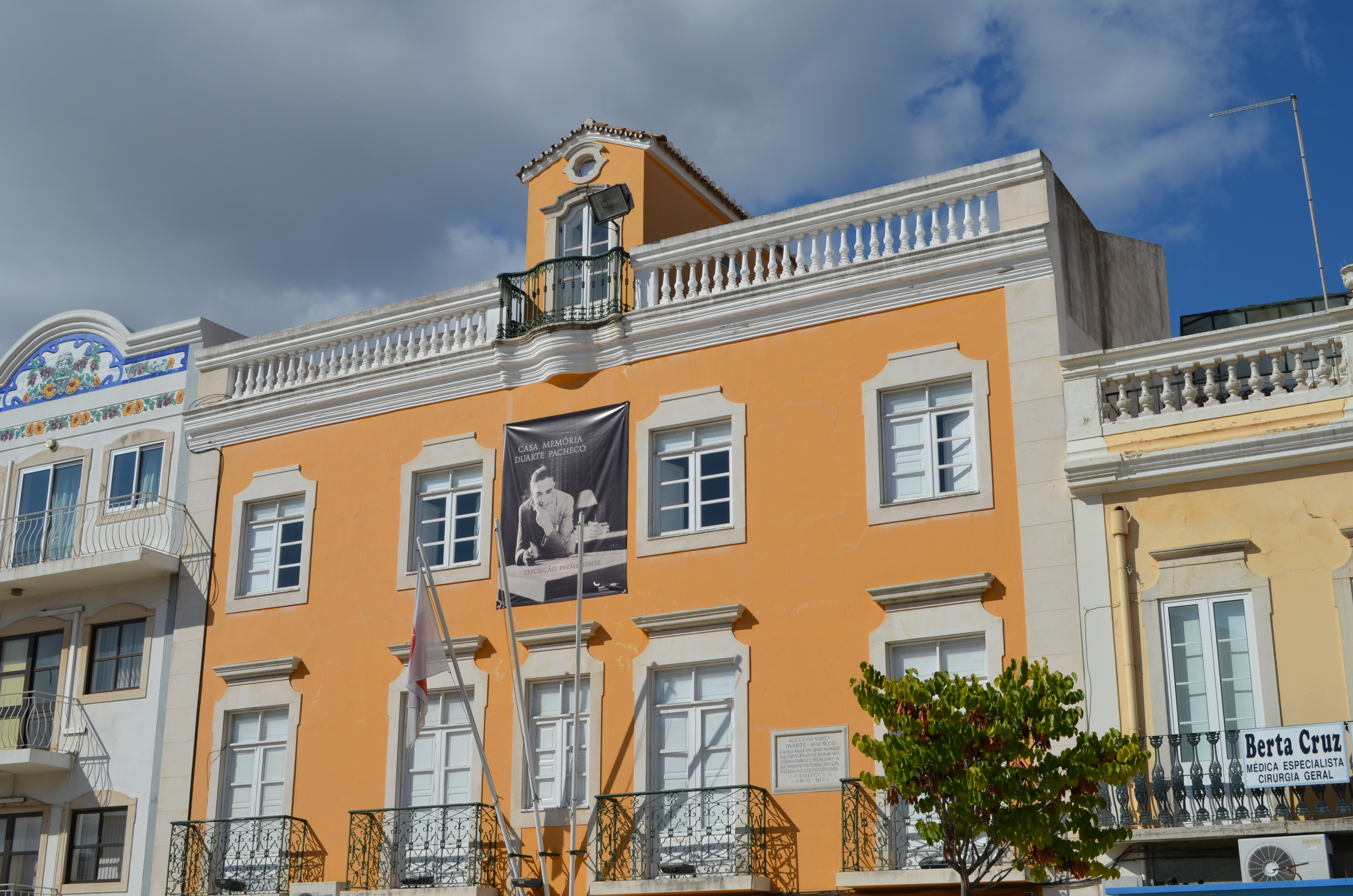
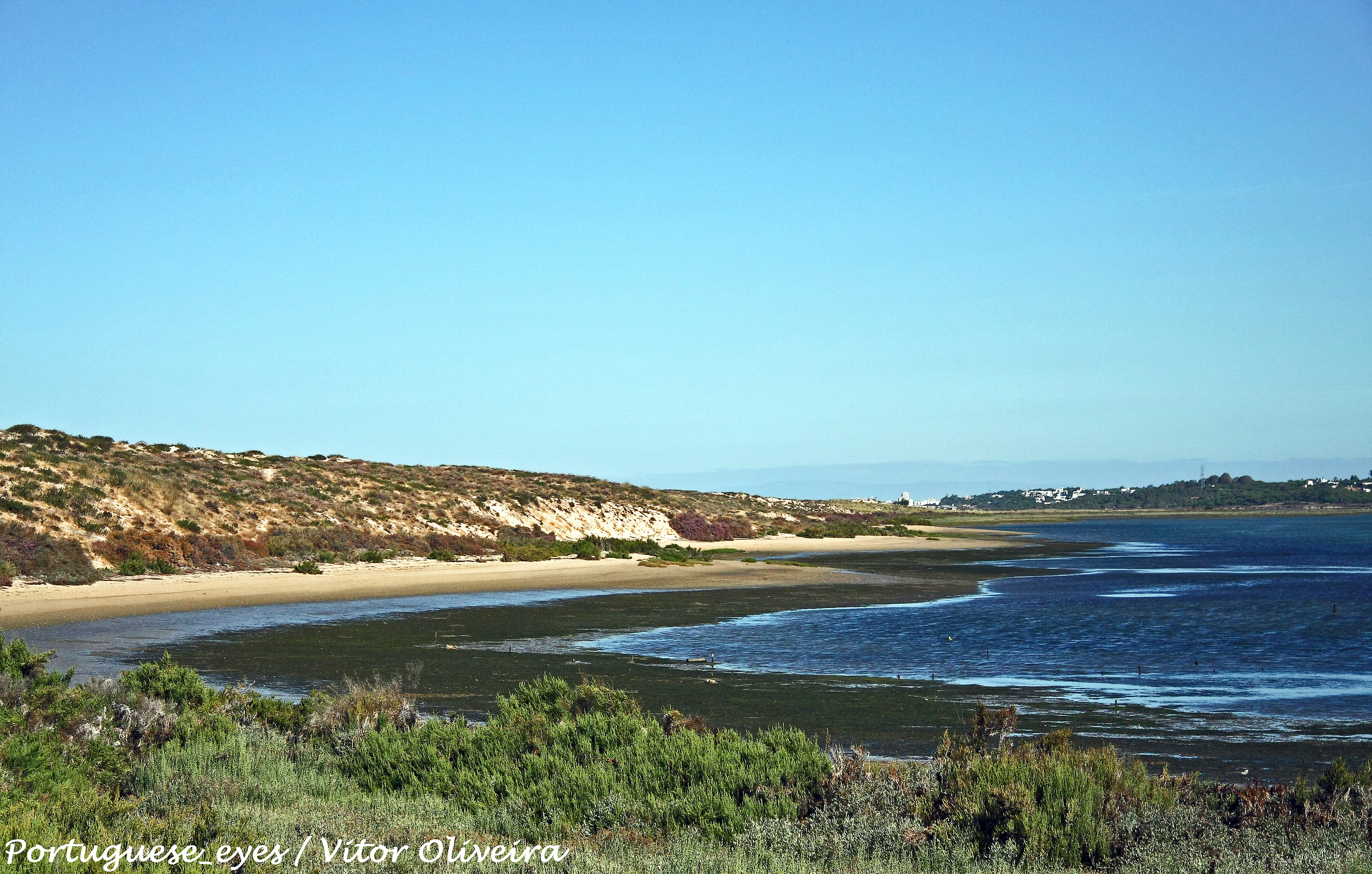
- Views of Loulé Municipality. The image on top is the seaside town of Quarteira. The seat of the municipality, the city of Loulé proper, is about 10 kilometres inland from the nearest coast.

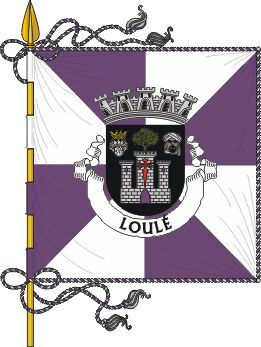
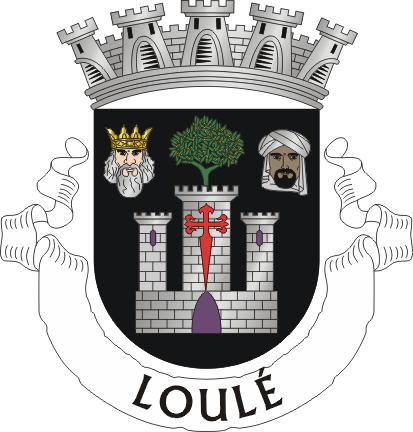
- Flag Coat of arms
- Interactive map of Loulé
- Location in Portugal
- Coordinates: 37°09′N 8°00′W
- Country: Portugal
- Region: Algarve
- Intermunic. comm.: Algarve
- District: Faro
- Established: Settlement: Late Paleolithic; Foral: c. 1249
- Parishes: 9

Government
  - President: Vitor Manuel Gonçalves Aleixo (PS)

Area
  - Total: 763.67 km^{2} (294.85 sq mi)
- Elevation: 49 m (161 ft)

Population (2025)
  - Total: 94 447
  - Density: 0.12/km^{2} (0.32/sq mi)
- Time zone: UTC+00:00 (WET)
  - Summer (DST): UTC+01:00 (WEST)
- Postal code: 8104-001
- Area code: 289
- Patron: Nossa Senhora da Piedade
- Local holiday: Ascension
- Website: www.cm-loule.pt

Loulé (locally [loˈlɛ]) is a city and municipality in the region of Algarve, district of Faro, Portugal. In 2025, the population of the entire municipality was 94 447 inhabitants, in an area of approximately 763.67 square kilometres (294.85 mi^{2}). The municipality has two principal cities: Loulé (the seat of the municipality) and Quarteira.

== History ==
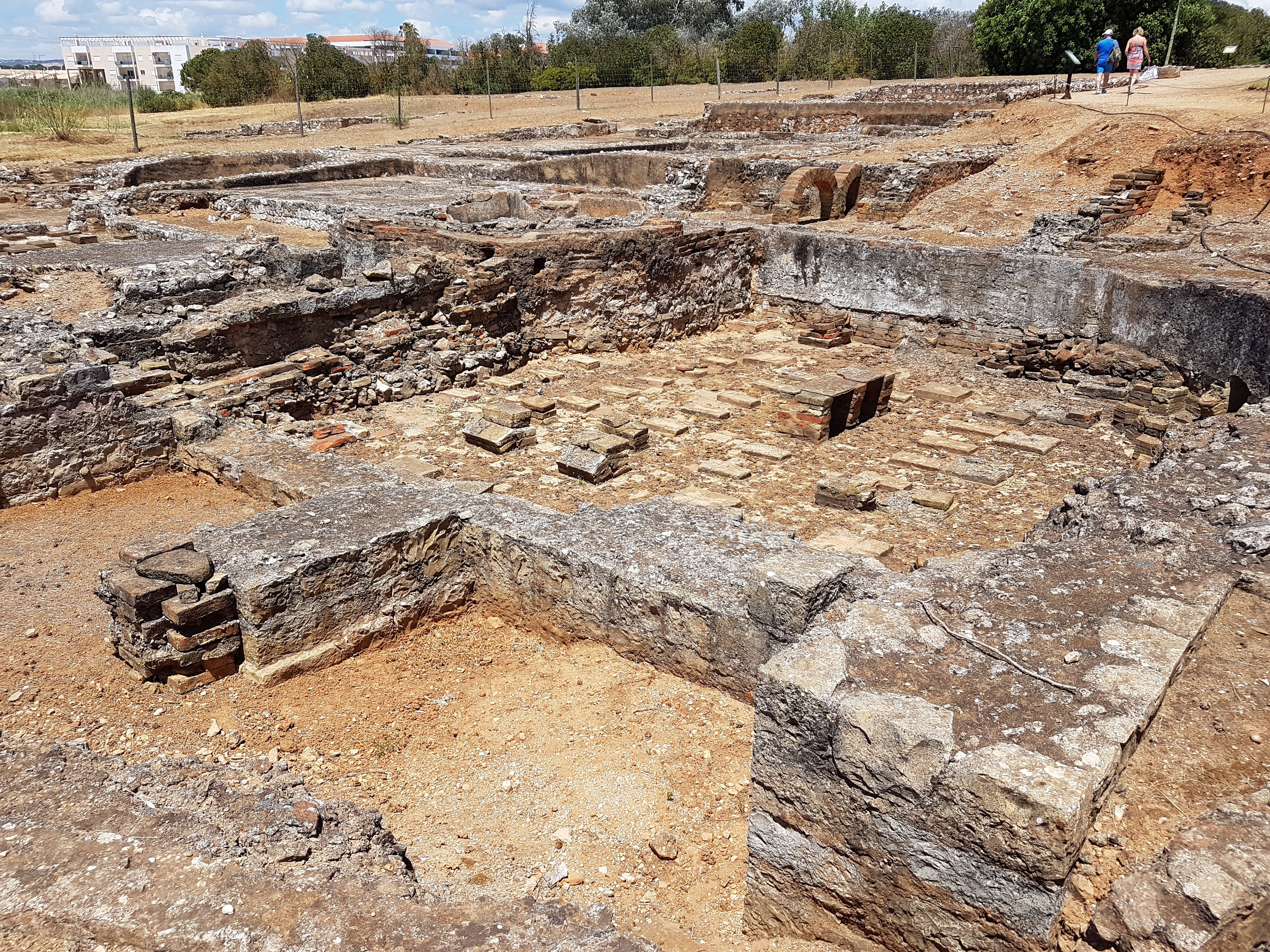
Ruins of the Roman settlement of Cerro da Vila

Human presence in the territory of Loulé dates back to the Later Paleolithic. The growth of the settlement of Loulé likely stemmed from the late Neolithic, when small bands began rotating agricultural crops and herds around numerous subterranean cavities in its proximity (specifically around Goldra, Esparguina and Matos da Nora).

Within the following millennium, the settlements began to grow and intensify with spread of Mediterranean cultures, that progressively penetrated the southwestern part of the peninsula. This culminated in the arrival of the Phoenicians and Carthaginians, who founded the first trading posts along the coast, increasing fishing, prospecting for minerals and commercial activities.

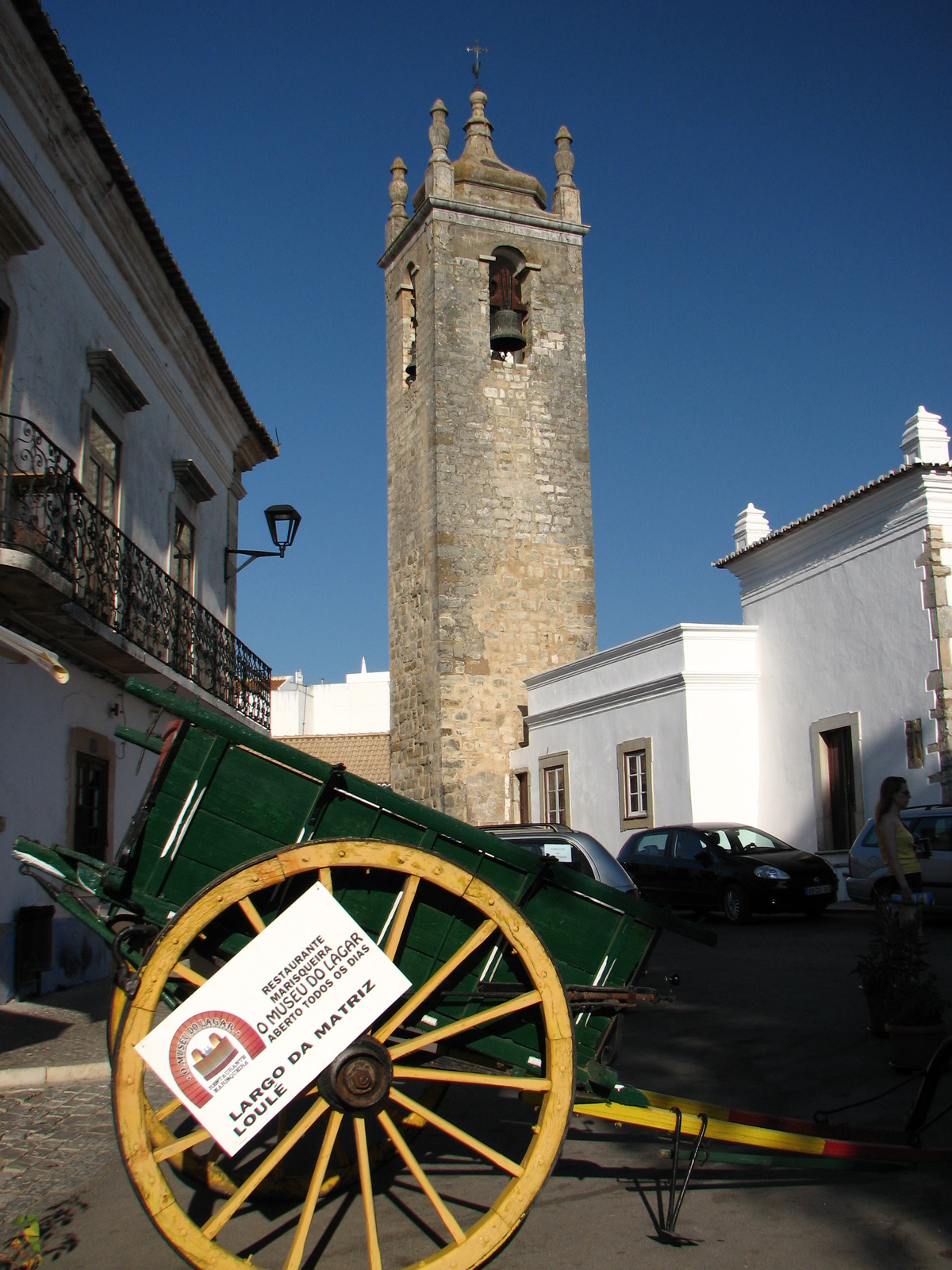
St Clemens Church belfry is an original minaret of a former Moor mosque in Loulé.

After the 2nd-century Punic War, the Romans provided a new impulse to economic activities, expanding the canning industry, agriculture and exploration of copper and iron. In the urban area of Loulé, a sculpted altar to the Goddess Diana, the rustic villages of Clareanes and Apra, and necropolises suggested the extent of Roman occupation. In the 5th century, the Suevians and Vandals, and later the Visigoths, destroyed many of the vestiges of Roman Empire, adapting and assimilating these earlier models of settlement and the cultural experiences of the native populations.

The arrival of Muslim Moors, in the 8th century, led to the rise of the historic Al-'Ulya' (Loulé), consisting of a small almedina (fortified city) under the reign of Niebla, under the command of Taifa Ibne Mafom. The second half of the 12th century was an epoch marked by great political and military instability, with internal dissensions across the Garb Andaluz, supported by military constructions. It is possible that Al-'Ulya' was fortified during this period. The remains of the primitive keep remain, practically intact, the Taipa tower (Torre da Vela) situated along the old Rua da Corredora (today the Rua Engº Duarte Pacheco).

The bell tower of Loulé St Clemens Church (São Clemente) was originally a minaret of a former Muslim mosque. It is one of the few remaining Islamic religious architectural elements from the Moor rule in Portugal. Located across the church is Jardim dos Amuados, which is an old Moorish cemetery.

=== Kingdom ===
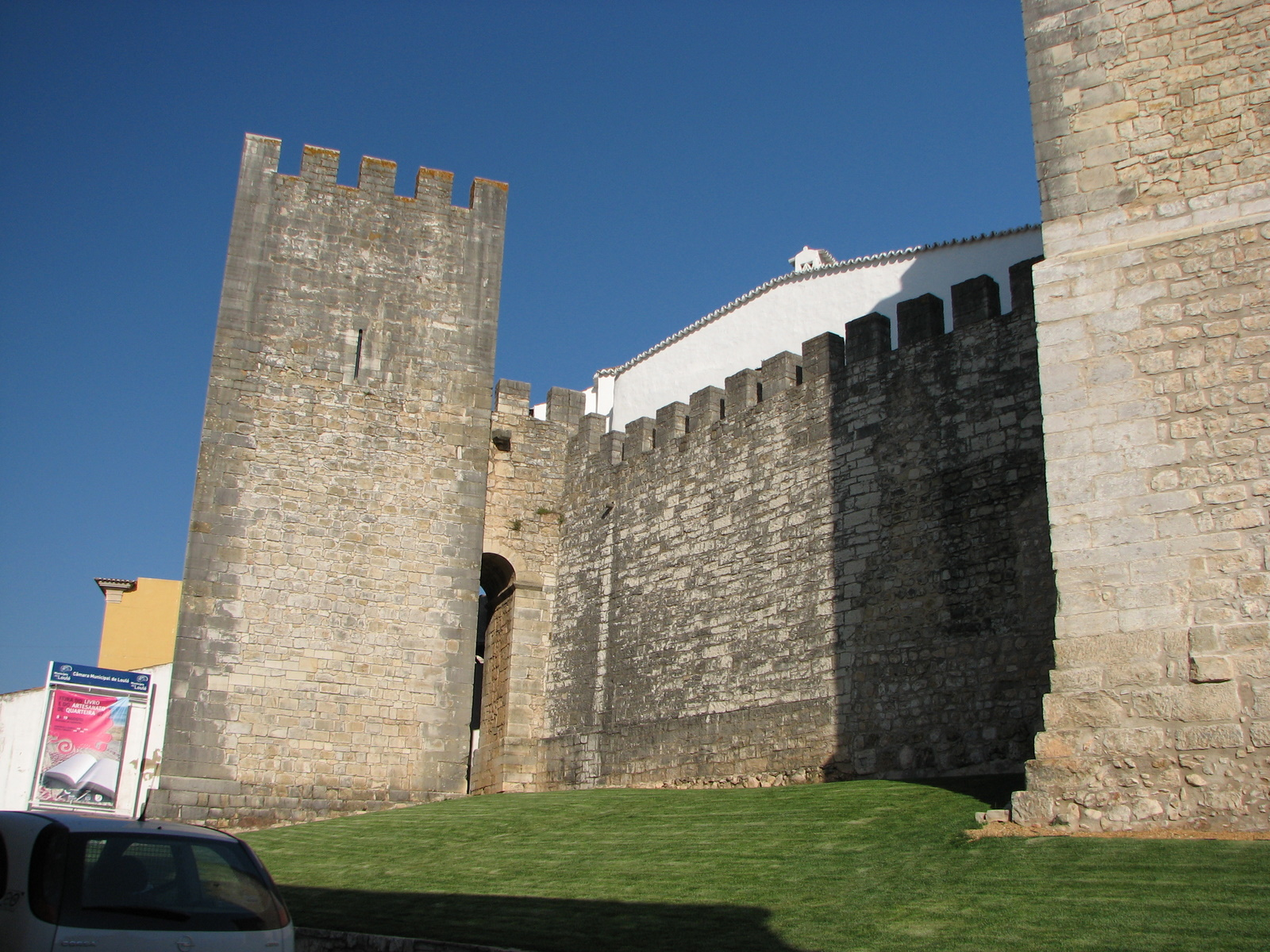
The walls of the Castle of Loulé, reconstructed during the Nationalist Estado Novo era

In 1249, King D. Afonso III supported by D. Paio Peres Correia, Knight and Master of the Order of Santiago, conquered the castle from the Moors, and integrated into the possessions of the Portuguese Crown. The first foral (charter) was issued to the settlement in 1266. A second foral was issued in 1269, to the southern suburbs of Mouraria with narrow winding streets and medieval toponyms, such as Rua da Mouraria and Rua dos Oleiros. The consequences of the Christian Reconquista had a negative effect on the economy of Loulé and its region, which was dependent on trade from northern Africa and Andalusia. King D. Denis ordered the establishment of a fair in Loulé, unique to the Algarve, that lasted 15 days in September: it was located in Rossio, in front of the Horta D’El Rei, alongside the Porta de Silves. The new economy, based on agriculture, supported by bartering across regions was insufficient to augment the isolation and stagnation by the end of the 14th century.

The desolate environment in which Loulé was present was supported by the 1385 Actas de Vereação (Acts of Town Council), by which Camareiro-Mor João Afonso affirmed that the village was unpopulated, its castle in ruins and debris littered the field. In order to alleviate the situation, King D. John I bestowed special privileges on the village to expand the settlement, then donated land in front of the Church of São Clemente for a courtyard. The Actas also gave notice that the King of Castile was prepared to enter Portugal. In order to prevent its possible attack, there was a move to repair the tower over the Porta de Faro and raise the walls along the southern flank.

This area, until the 16th century, for reasons of defence and accessibility was the principal urban space, penetrated by a various roadways: the Largo da Matriz which crossed the principal arterials (the Rua Martim Farto, Rua da Cadeia and Rua da Matriz) which connected the principal spaces of the village, alcaldery, town council, jailhouse and gates.

During Portugal's maritime expansion, the Algarve entered a new economic phase. Loulé, in this context, occupied an important place in the export of wine, olive oil, dried fruit, handicrafts, salt and fish which allowed it to prosper and recover from many years of stagnation and decay, allowing the town to expand public spaces and construct new infrastructures. In 1422, the walls were rebuilt under the orders of D. Henrique de Meneses, first Count of Loulé. In 1471, the old shelter was transformed, by order of King D. Afonso V, into the first hospital in the Algarve, in order to help injured soldiers that regressed from the battles in Tangiers.

To the north, and outside the walls, new residential spaces were organized, along the roadways that would become Rua do Poço, Travessa do Outeiro, Rua da Laranjeira and the Rua do Alto de São Domingos (where the Order of Santiago indicated existed the Hermitage of São Domingos in 1565). In the west, they constructed the Hermitage of São Sebastião half a league from the centre, and the Hermitage of Nossa Senhora da Piedade, which complemented the Church of Nossa Senhora dos Pobres (which was erected in 1400).

By the end of the 16th century, Portugal had lost its independence following the events of Alcácer Quibir. The region and village of Loulé was, once again, threatened by coastal attacks from pirates along the coast, yet the castle defences had already become threatened and had fallen into ruin. After 1630, the economic vitality of the Algarve began to fall, its populations stagnating and political instability contributing to Barbary Coast piracy.

The region's expansion suffered, even as new buildings were being constructed. In 1600, the Church of Portas do Ceu was constructed; in three of the gates of the castle they constructed hermitages to Nossa Senhora da Conceição, Nossa Senhora do Pilar and Nossa Senhora do Carmo; in the courtyard, they constructed the Church of Espírito Santo (then recovered and expanded in 1693); expanded the nunnery of Convent of Nossa Senhora da Conceição; and in the east, D. Francisco Barreto, second bishop of the Algarve, laid the cornerstone of the Convent of Santo António (1675). After the Restoration, the castle took on a defensive role and lands surrounding the structure were occupied by new construction.

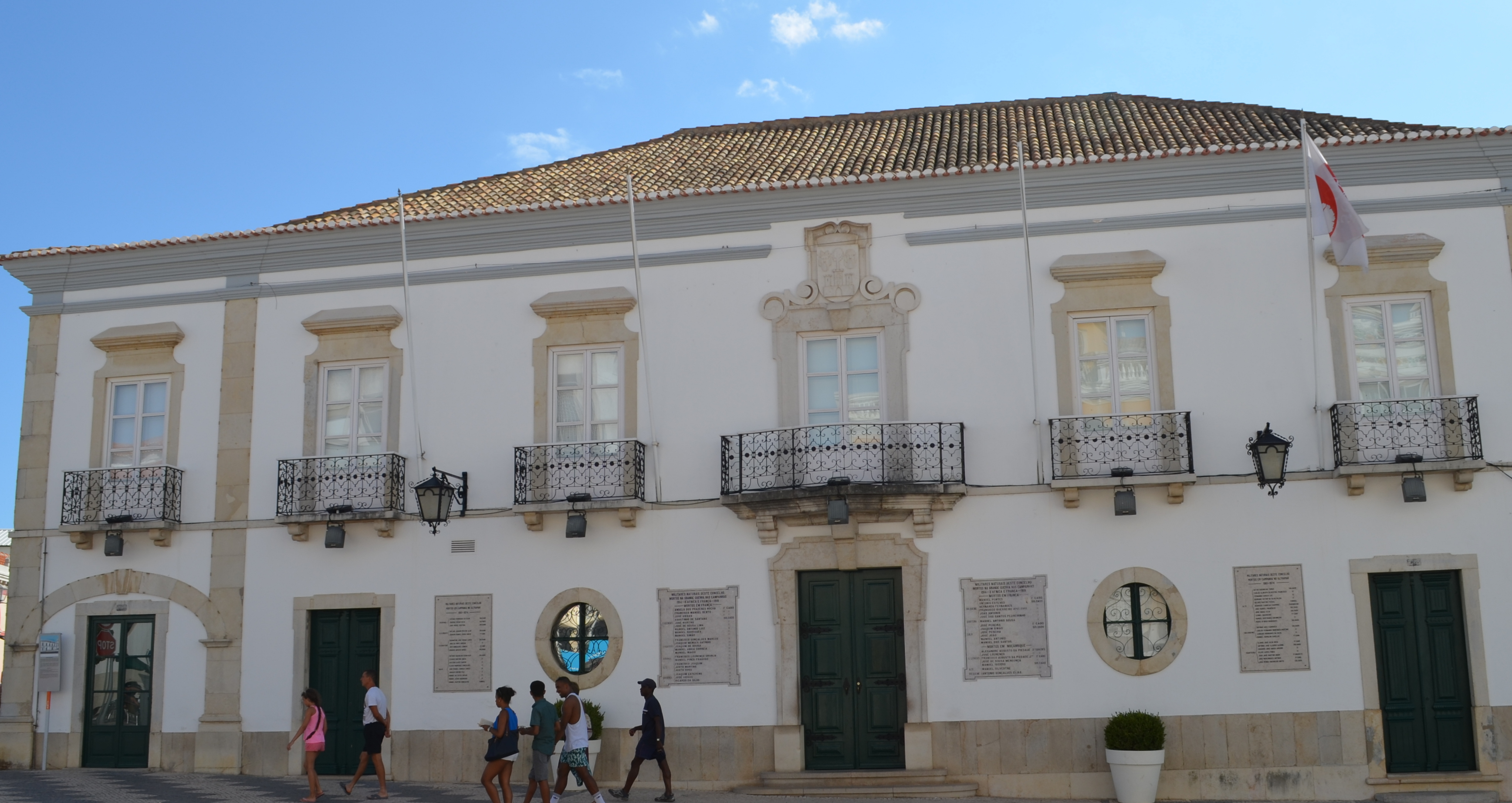
The 18th-century facade of the municipal council of Loulé

By the beginning of the 18th century, during the reign of John V, Portugal lived a period of economic prosperity sustained by gold from Brazil. Many of the churches and chapels were enriched by the spoils of conquest; gold, azulejo, rich woods, and artistic treasures were used to beautify the religious structures of the kingdom, by artesans in the region and factories in the north. A group of public works expanded to the edge of the town, primarily west of the Convent of Graça, south of the old Corredoura, east of the old Largo dos Inocentes square and Rua da Carreira, and north to the Rua da Praça and Rua da Laranjeira.

Much of the village was destroyed in the 1722 and 1755 earthquakes: the towers of the castle cracked, walls crumbled, the church and Convent of Graça collapsed, and the parochial church experienced grave damage; those civilian buildings that were not destroyed became uninhabited and the municipal hall was so damaged that sessions were realized in a small house along Rua Ancha, later in a building on the edge of the municipal square. After the reconstruction of the village new residential areas began to pop up with several occupied by the local merchant class.

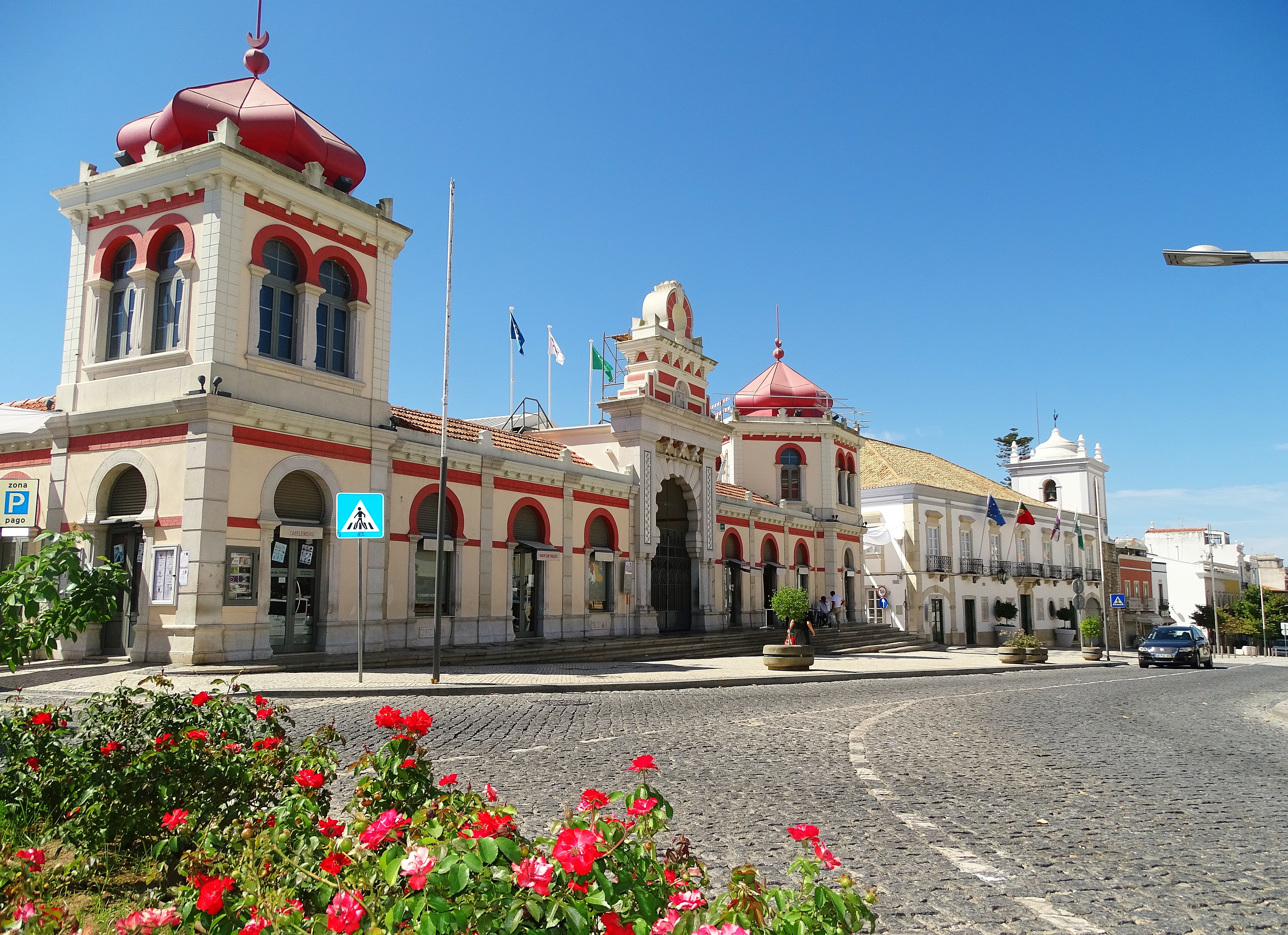
The 19th century neo-Classical Arabesque-inspired marketplace of Loulé

In the first quarter of the 19th century, in the political instability generated by the Napoleonic Wars, the flight of the monarchy and the Liberal Wars provoked an economic crisis. In order to alleviate the financial burden and consolidate the public debit, Ministro da Fazenda (Minister of Finances), Mouzinho da Silveira decreed the sale of national possessions and expropriation of convents. As a consequence, the Convent of Espírito Santo, closed since 1836, was occupied and transformed into the municipal hall and judicial tribunal, while the church was converted into a theatre.

Meanwhile, alongside the walls of the old castle, the lots were occupied for residential and commercial purposes. However, the greatest transformation occurred with the opening of Avenida Marçal Pacheco that connected the east and west, along the Rua da Praça (today Avenida Praça da República), resulting in the demolition the hermitage of Carmo and part of the wall alongside. The Rua da Praça was along the principal circulation of the most important social, economic and cultural space in the town. In 1885, it began to symbolize the most important political space in the town, after the municipal council was transferred to its current place.

At the end of the 19th century, the town had expanded to the west, initiating a new phase of urbanization in Quinta do Olival de São Francisco, which was integrated into the new civil parish of São Sebastião, created in 1890 after São Clemente was divided. This new zone had a modern plan with roads design from existing roadways, forming rectangular blocks and triangular public spaces. The urban and demographic growth in this period was associated with industrialization that attracted a nascent population to small artisanal factories. This process was aided by the evolution of transport, the construction of railway lines in the Algarve and the development of communication lines that contributed to the demographic shift of the municipality.

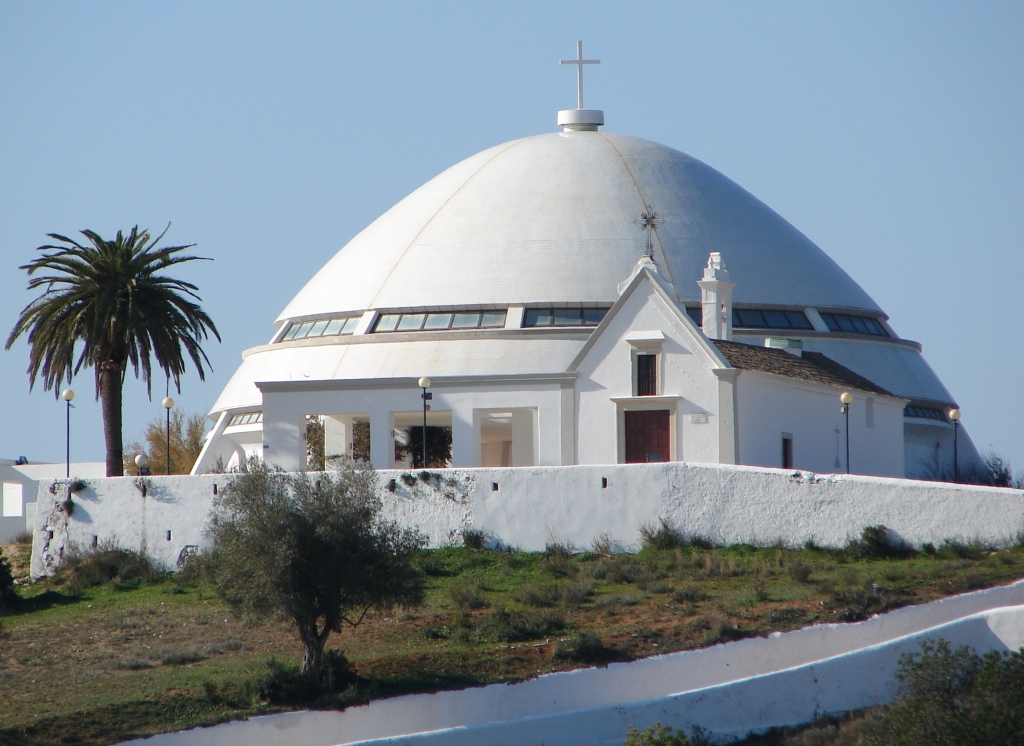
The modernist design of the Sanctuary of Nossa Senhora da Piedade

Before the establishment of the First Republic, many of the contemporary architectural structures were constructed, including the municipal market, a project of architect Mota Gomes. This project substantially altered the urban character of the town, provoking the considerable destruction of the castle. But, it was the opening of the Avenida José da Costa Mealha that had a considerable logistic and architectural impact on the town. Until the establishment of the Estado Novo, the greatest improvements came from replacing the public lighting and installation of a water supply and drainage system.

Following the military coup on 28 May 1926, until the Carnation Revolution, the growth of Loulé proceeded moderately with the modernization of Avenida José da Costa Mealha (today Avenida 25 de Abril), that helped to spur many of the more expressive buildings in the town (such as the Cine-Teatro Louletano and the Duarte Pacheco monument). These developments assisted in accelerating the construction in Loulé. To the northeast and south of Avenida José da Costa Mealha large residential blocks occupied old agricultural properties and traditional architecture.

== Geography ==
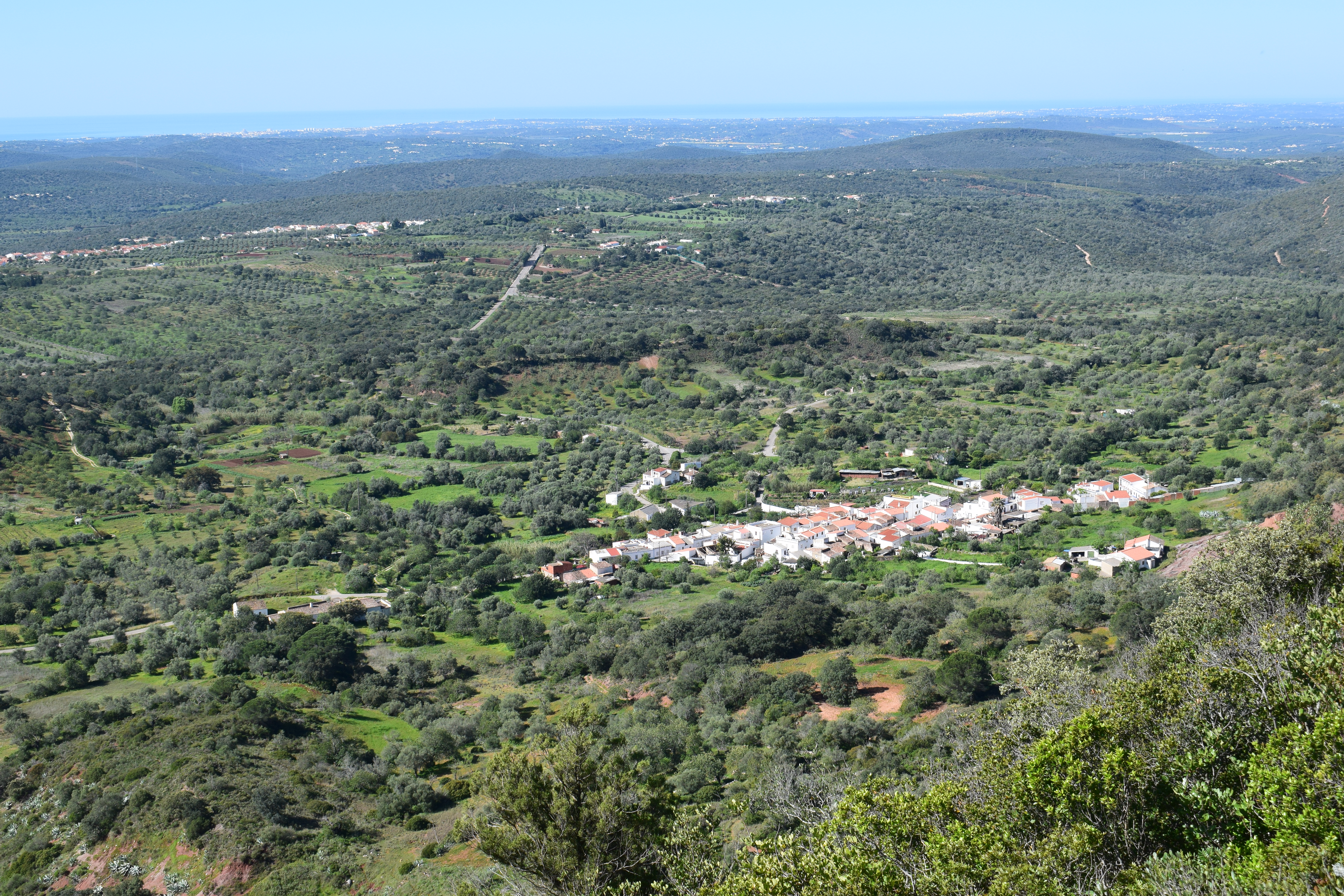
The landscape from Rocha da Pena towards the village of Penina

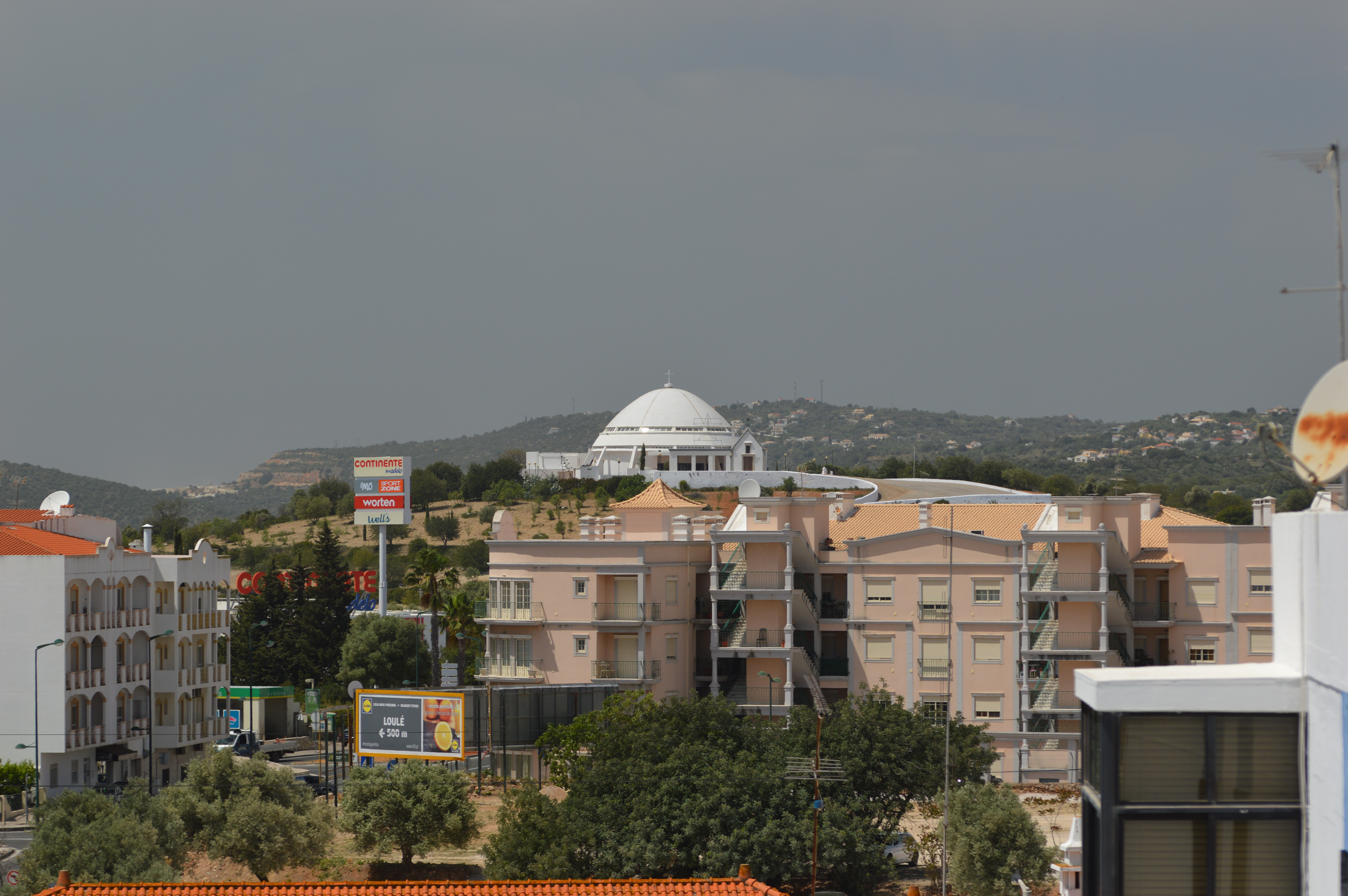
The cityscape of Loulé with the sanctuary of Nossa Senhora da Piedade in the distance

Loulé is well known for the sandy beaches, such as Quarteira. Inland, Loulé shows a rich geology, paleontology, and wildlife. The seat of the municipality, the city of Loulé proper, is about 10 kilometres inland from the nearest coast at an elevation exceeding 100 meters and higher.

Administratively, the municipality is divided into 9 civil parishes (freguesias):

- Almancil
- Alte
- Ameixial
- Boliqueime
- Quarteira
- Querença, Tôr e Benafim
- Salir
- São Clemente
- São Sebastião

== Culture ==
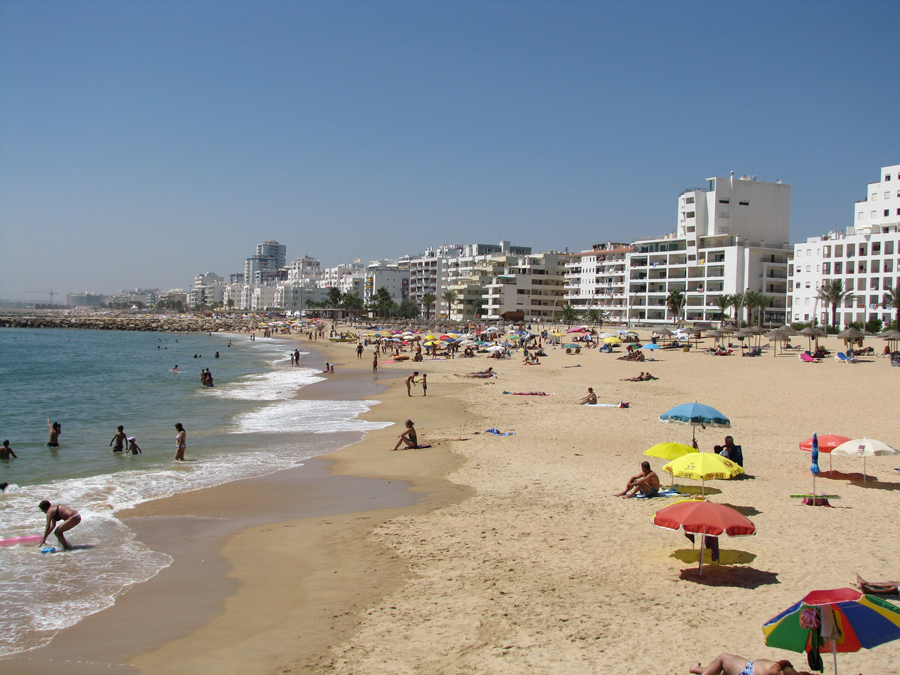
The beach of Praia da Gaivota with resort hotels in the background

A highlight of the summer months in Loulé is Noite Branca, the Festival of White Night held to celebrate the end of summer. Locals and tourists, all wearing white, converge on the town, where a dazzling display of music, dance and pageantry awaits. Young people wander the streets, dressed in white as princes and princesses, demons and winged fantasy figures, while live bands play in the background. Loulé is also the largest municipality in the Algarve and includes well-known towns near the sea (like Vilamoura or Quinta do Lago) but also the hidden villages in the Algarve mountains where there are unmistakable landscapes.

== Economy ==
The tertiary sector is the engine of the economy of Loulé municipality and is related to tourism, namely sun and beach tourism in such places like Vilamoura and Quarteira. In the primary sector, the agricultural area occupies about 34.2% of the area of the municipality, with the predominance of cereals for grain, citrus, vines and dried fruits, temporary grassland and forage crops. With regard to livestock, poultry, sheep and pigs stand out as the main species produced. Loulé has a high forest density of almost 50% (49.8%) of the useful agricultural area, which corresponds to 12,216 ha, devoted essentially to plantations of pine tree. The food, construction and cement industries (CIMPOR has a major cement plant in Loulé) are the main economic activities of the secondary sector.

== Sport ==
In Pavilhão Desportivo Municipal de Loulé (an indoor sports arena), a World Cup is held every year in the sport of trampolining. The most noteworthy football team in Loulé is the Louletano D.C. Louletano-Loulé Concelho is a professional cycling team based in Loulé.

== Notable citizens ==
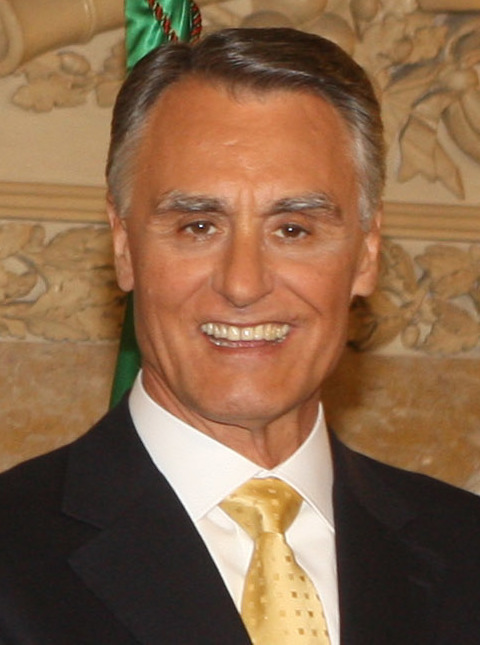
Aníbal Cavaco Silva, 2007

- José Mendes Cabeçadas (1883–1965) a Navy officer, freemason, republican and revolutionary
- Duarte Pacheco (1900–1943) a Government minister responsible for improving Portuguese infrastructure during the Estado Novo era.
- Pedro Correia de Barros (1911–1968) navy officer and governor of Mozambique 1958-1961
- Laura Ayres (1922–1992) a virologist, a pioneer in the fight against AIDS
- John Jacob Lavranos (1926–2018) a Greek/South African insurance broker and botanist, lived in Loulé from 1995
- Aníbal Cavaco Silva (born 1939) a Portuguese economist, scholar, Prime Minister of Portugal 1985-1995 and 19th President of Portugal 2006-2016
- António Carrilho (born 1942) a Roman Catholic priest and Bishop of Funchal
- Vítor Aleixo (born 1956) the current mayor of Loulé
- Nuno Guerreiro (born 1972), Portuguese singer (lead vocalist of Ala dos Namorados).
- Jamila Madeira (born 1975) a politician and Member of the European Parliament
- Dânia Neto (born 1983) an actress and model

== Tourism ==
Loulé has developed its Cultural Tourism through exhibitions, markets, fairs and processions. It is an official Creative Tourism City and offers to tourists cultural authenticity.
