= Toledo Infantry Academy =

Military training center of the Spanish Army in Toledo

Coordinates: 39.8573°N 4.0147°W

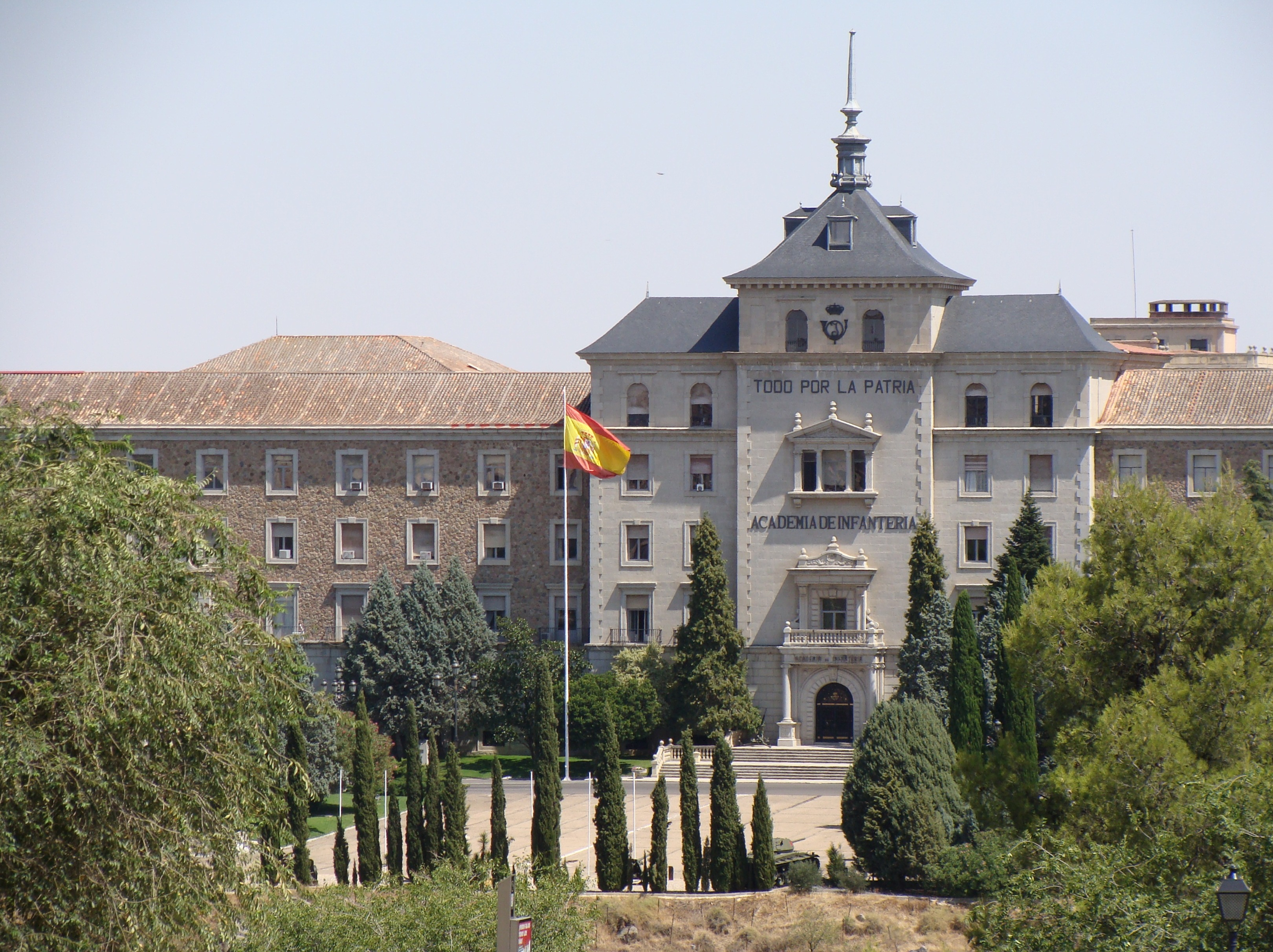
Facade of the Toledo Infantry Academy

The Toledo Infantry Academy (ACINF) is a military academy of Spanish Army, located in the city of Toledo, Spain. The center is responsible for providing basic training, specialization and training for officers and non-commissioned officers of the infantry branch of the Spanish Army. Lying at the opposite bank of the Tagus than the main urban core, it is connected to the Santa Bárbara residential area through the Cuesta de San Servando.

== History ==
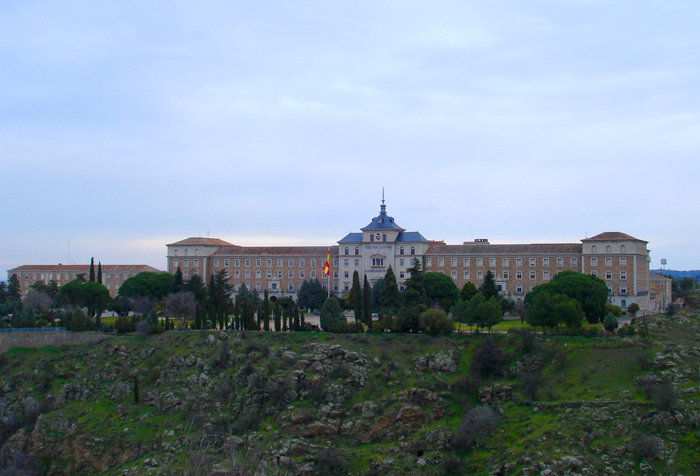
Main facade of the Toledo Infantry Academy.

The academy was created with the name of "Infantry College in Toledo" in 1850. On October 17, 1875, after having been temporarily transferred to Madrid, the academy was relocated in the Alcázar of Toledo. It was closed in 1882 to be absorbed by the newly created General Military Academy, but was re-established as the Academy of Infantry in 1893 when the General Military Academy was dissolved.

As the result of a siege, the Alcázar was reduced to a ruin during the Spanish Civil War. After the war the Infantry Academy was provisionally installed in Zaragoza, at the building of the Military General Academy, and in Guadalajara, San Diego de Alcalá Foundation headquarters. During 1948 - 1949, the academy returned to Toledo, to a new building, which was the work of the military engineers Lieutenant Colonel Manuel Carrasco Cadenas, Lieutenant Colonel Arturo Ureña Escario, and Lieutenant Colonel Julio Hernández García. The building, constructed in Neo-Renaissance and Neo-Herrerian style, harmonizes well with the Alcázar, located on the opposite side of the River Tagus.
