= Church of San Andrés, Toledo =

Catholic church in Castile-La Mancha, Spain

Coordinates: 39.8545°N 4.0241°W

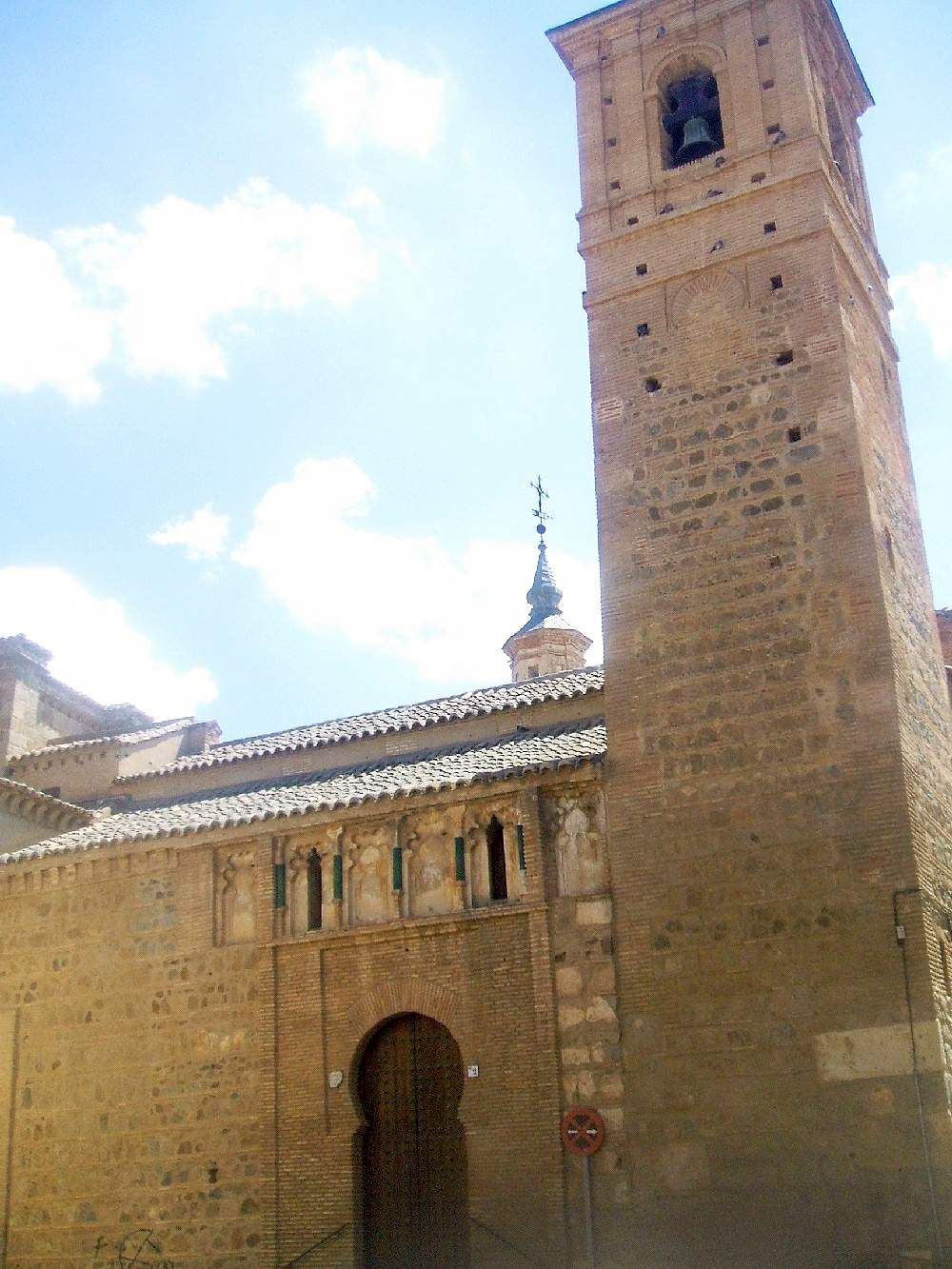
The church with its Islamic-influenced doorway

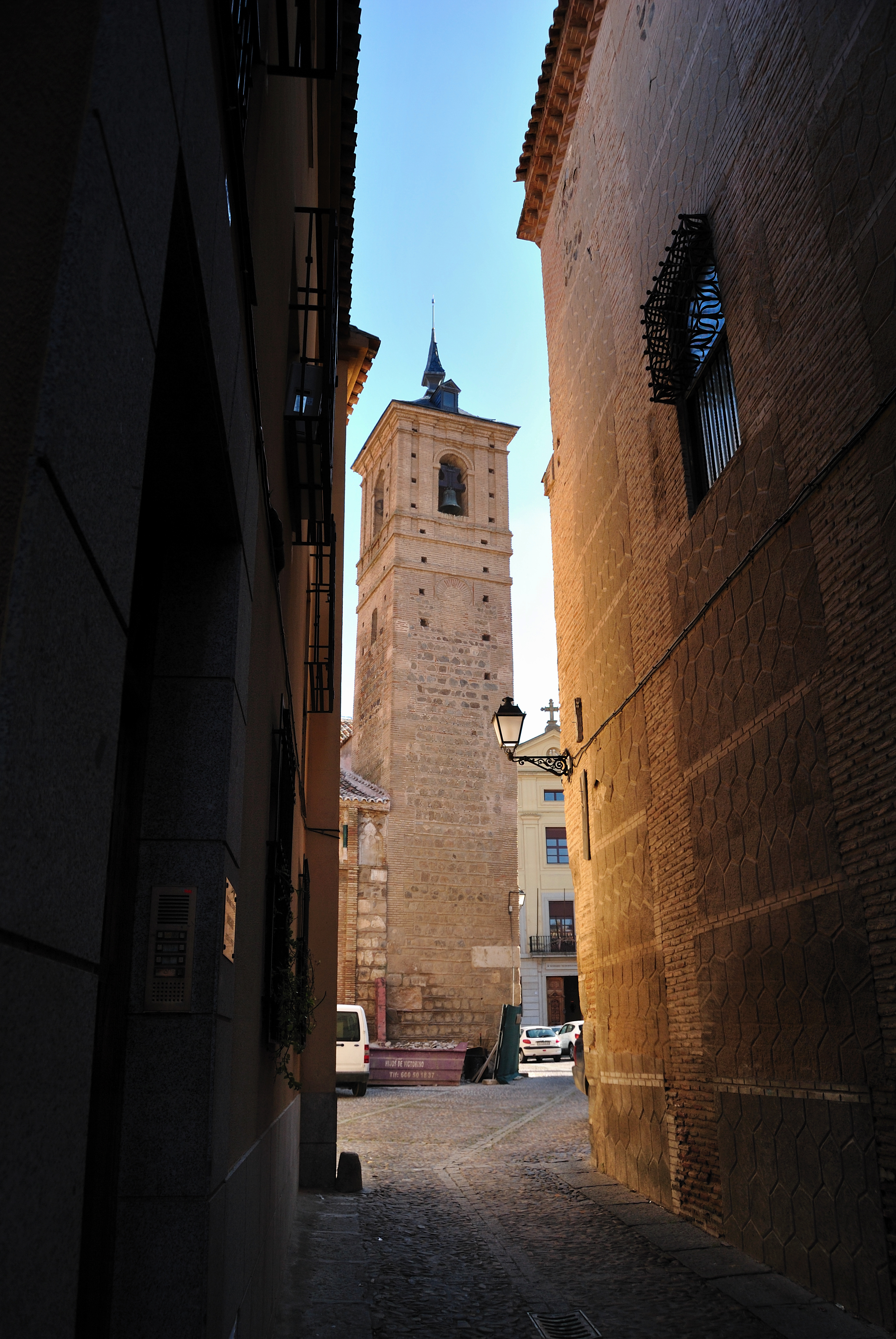
Tower of the church

The Church of San Andrés (Spanish: Iglesia de San Andrés) is a Catholic church located in the city of Toledo, in Castile-La Mancha, Spain. The building is of medieval origin, and as is common in this city, is a mix of different styles. It is protected by the heritage listing Bien de Interés Cultural.

== Architecture ==
The architecture includes examples of Mudéjar, Gothic and Baroque styles, the last as a result of a remodeling of the 17th century. After the last restoration traceries appeared in the facade that evoke the eclecticism of the crossing. A Visigothic relief and two Visigothic pilasters was also discovered.

As with most of the Mudéjar churches in Toledo, it presents a simple aspect. Its main entrance, unique in Toledo, is in Almohad style bearing uncommon small green ceramic in columns on the door. The capitals are Visigothic. Its mosque past is being represented by a funeral pilaster.

During the 16th century its solid late Gothic head was added, with exterior buttresses that compensate for the considerable change in height, while its interior features a vault and palm arch ribs with honeycomb work in the transept naves.

== Mummies ==
In the crypt of this church are 60 mummies of infants, dukes, nuns and people of popular classes, in a good state of preservation and available for the public to view.
