= Santa Bárbara (Toledo) =

- City district
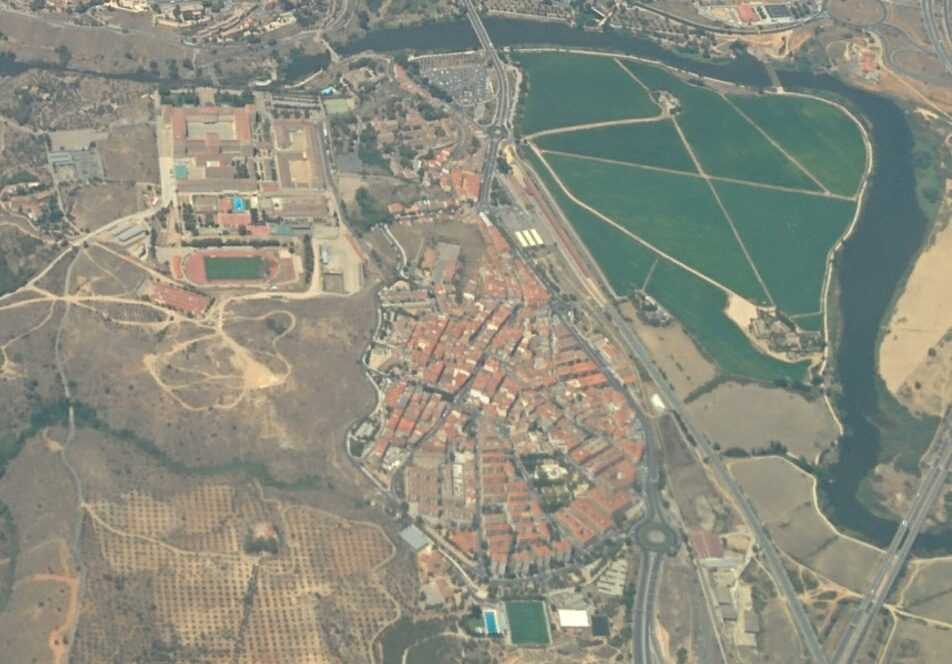

- Country: Spain
- Region: Castilla–La Mancha
- Municipality: Toledo

Population (2018)
  - Total: 7,888

Santa Bárbara is a district (number 2) and neighborhood of Toledo, Spain.

Through the Cuesta de San Servando, the urbanised area is connected to the historic centre (at the opposite bank of the Tagus) as well as to the Castle of San Servando, the Toledo Infantry Academy and the Provincial Hospital of Toledo, which are all located within the district limits. It has its own football turf, located in the east of the urbanised area. As of 1 January 2018, the district has a population of 7,888 inhabitants (the district consists solely of the namesake neighborhood).
