= Puerta del Cambrón =

Gate in Toledo, Spain

Coordinates: 39.8593°N 4.0323°W

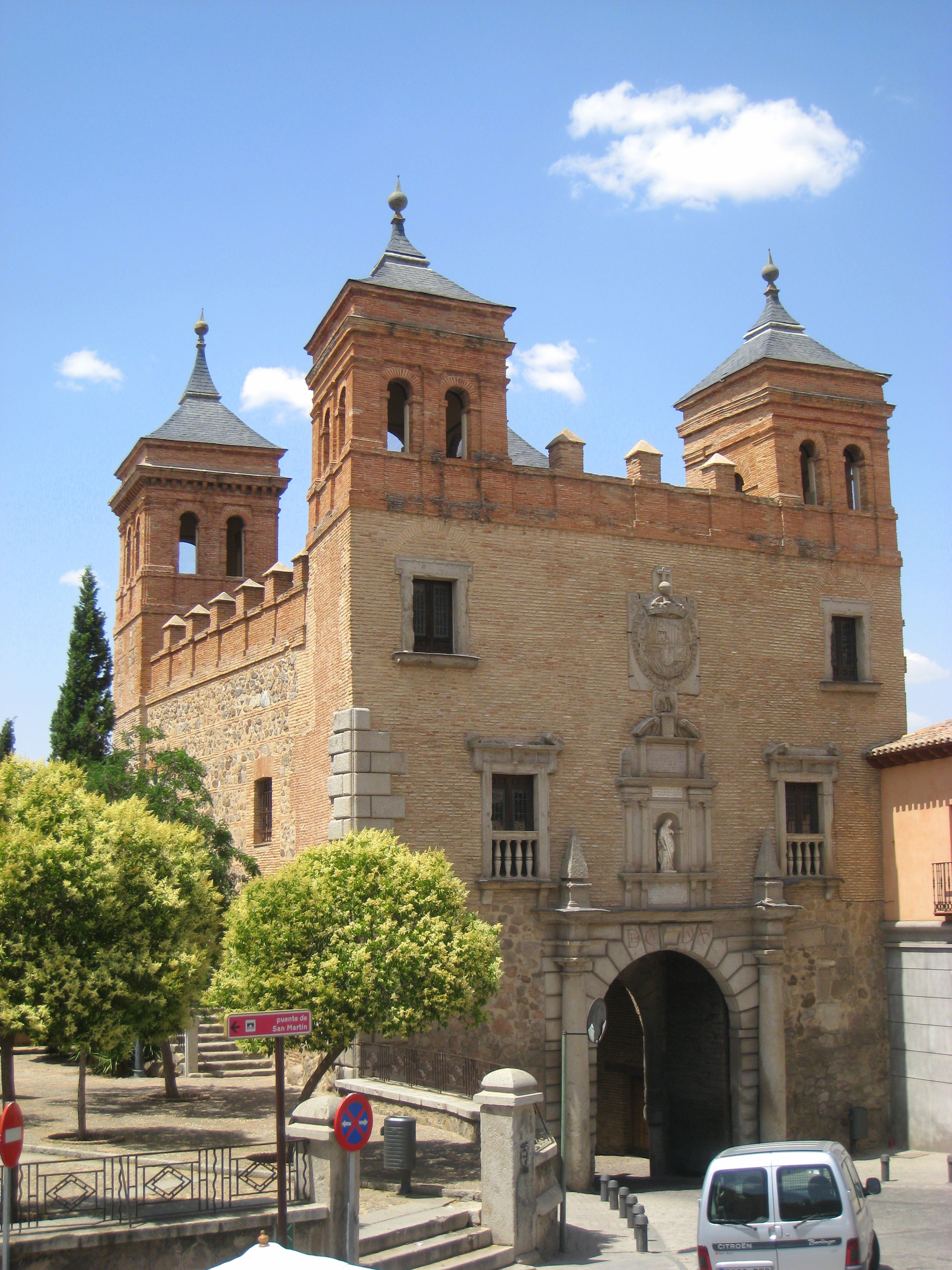
General view of the gate, internal side

The Puerta del Cambrón is a gate located in the west sector of the Spanish city of Toledo, in Castile-La Mancha. Also called previously "Gate of the Jews" or "Gate of Saint Leocadia", has been speculated The possibility that the name of the gate, del Cambrón, had its origin in the growth of a thorn bush or plant at the top of the ruins of one of the towers, before the last reconstruction of the gate, In 1576. It has the cataloging of Bien de Interés Cultural. (Note: The whole wall of Toledo, together with its towers and bridges, was declared "National Monument" on December 21, 1921, and the declaration was published in the "Gaceta de Madrid" on December 25 of that year.)

== Features ==
Of Renaissance style, has two pairs of towers and two arches, being built of stone and brick. It underwent two renovations in the early-1570s and in 1576. Hernán González, Diego de Velasco and Juan Bautista Monegro would sculpt a figure of Leocadia in the gate. The gate was slightly damaged during the Spanish Civil War.

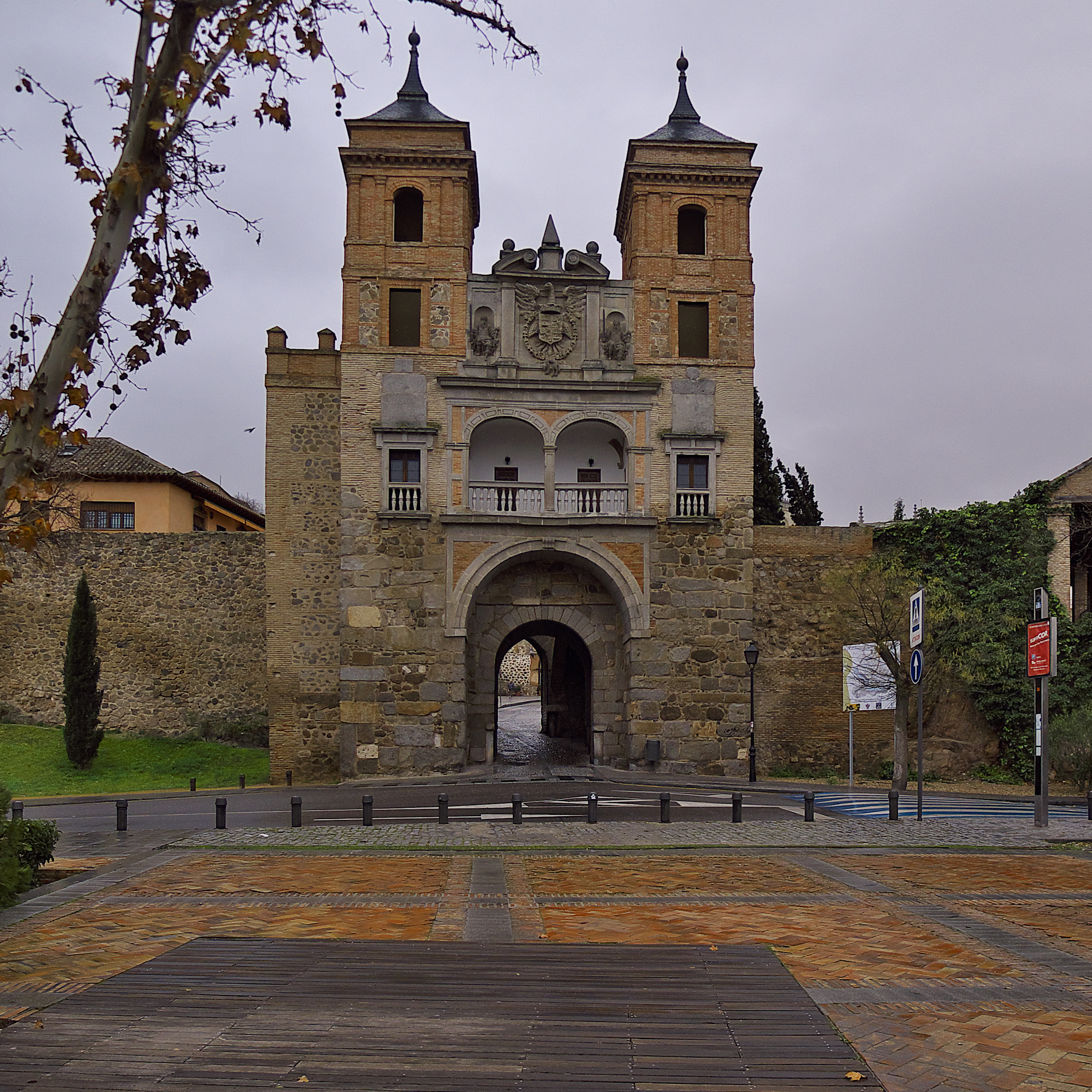
Northwest facade

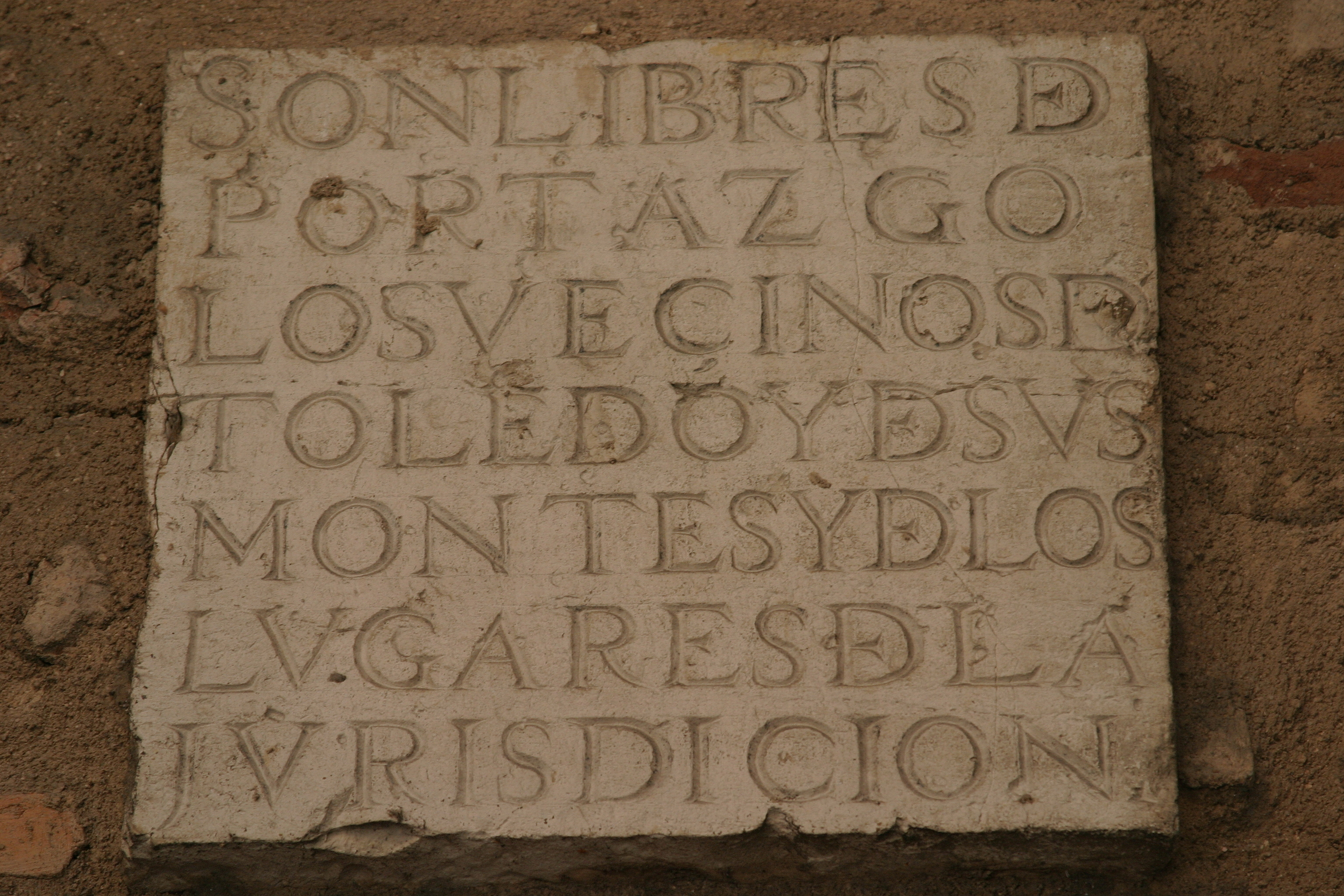
Inscription

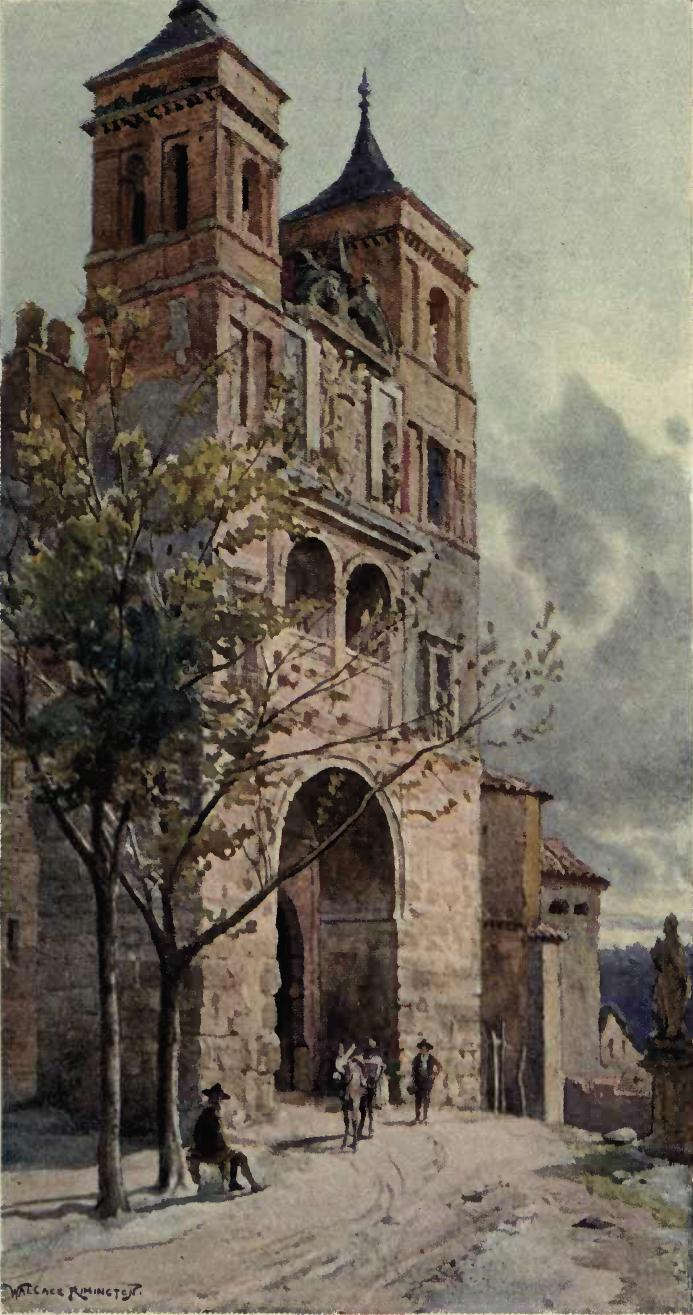
Illustration by A. Wallace Rimington, published in The Cities of Spain (1909)

== Bibliography ==
- Alguacil Casiano (1870). Toledo artistic monuments. ISBN 9788490013106. Text, but not this edition, is in the public domain.
- Ana María Arias de Cossío (2010). The art of the Spanish Renaissance. Encuentro. ISBN 9788499205090.
- Edward Hutto (1906). The cities of Spain. New York: Methuen & Co.
- Fernando Marías (1986). The Renaissance architecture in Toledo (1541-1631). Editorial CSIC - CSIC Press. ISBN 9788400061760.
