= Santa María de Benquerencia =

- City district
- Country: Spain
- Region: Castilla–La Mancha
- Municipality: Toledo

Population (2018)
  - Total: 22,110

Santa María de Benquerencia, also known as (el) Polígono, is a district (number 3) of Toledo, Spain.

Detached from the city core, it lies to the east of the former, at the left-bank of the Tagus. Its origins trace back to 1964 when the earth-moving works intending to build an industrial area started. However, not much after, the first neighbors installed in 1971, eventually also becoming a residential area.

As of 1 January 2018, it has a population of 22,110 inhabitants: 21,911 in the residential area neighborhood (the most populated neighborhood in the municipality) and 199 in the industrial area neighborhood.
