= Carcamusas =

Traditional Spanish dish

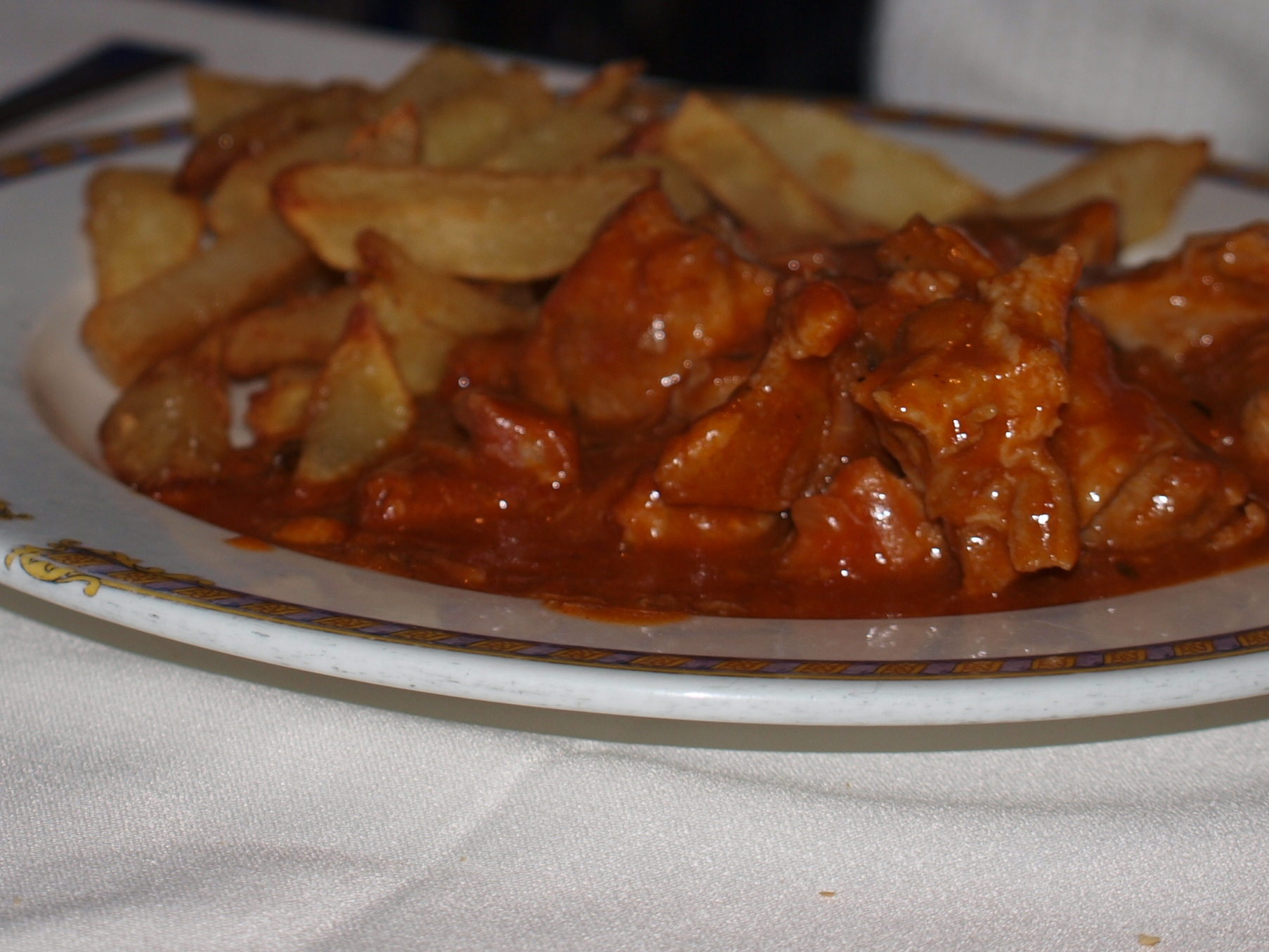

Carcamusas is a culinary specialty of Toledo, Spain, generally served as a tapa in bars. It consists of a stew of lean pork with a moderately spicy tomato sauce and peas. It is traditionally served in an earthenware casserole, along with potatoes and bread.

The origin of the name "carcamusas" is unclear. One theory attributes it to the owner of the restaurant Bar Ludeña in the mid 20th century, who served the dish to a clientele consisting of older men, known as "carcas," and the younger women they considered their muses, or "musas."
