= Toledo, Spain =

City in Castilla–La Mancha, Spain

Toledo
- Municipality
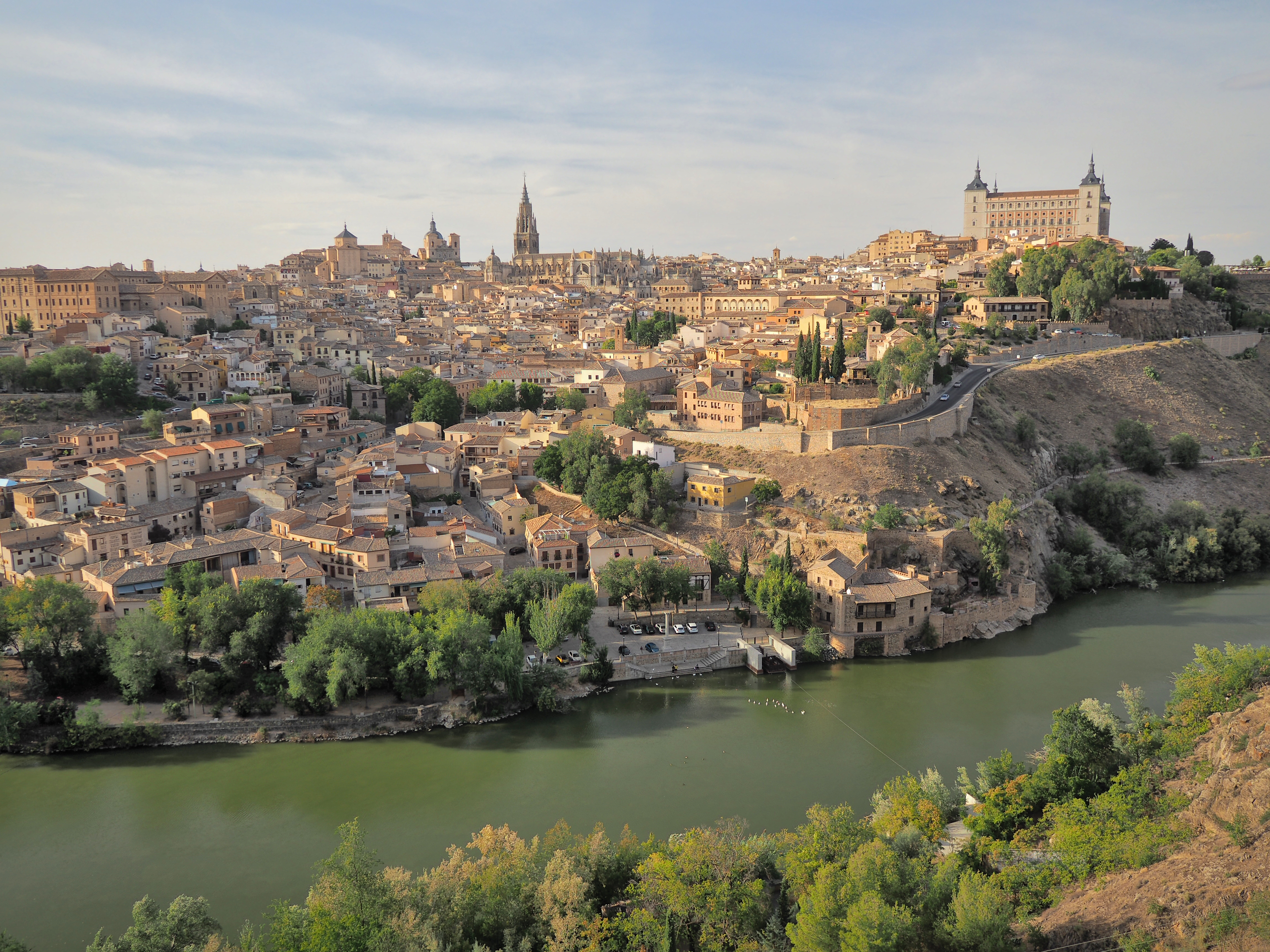
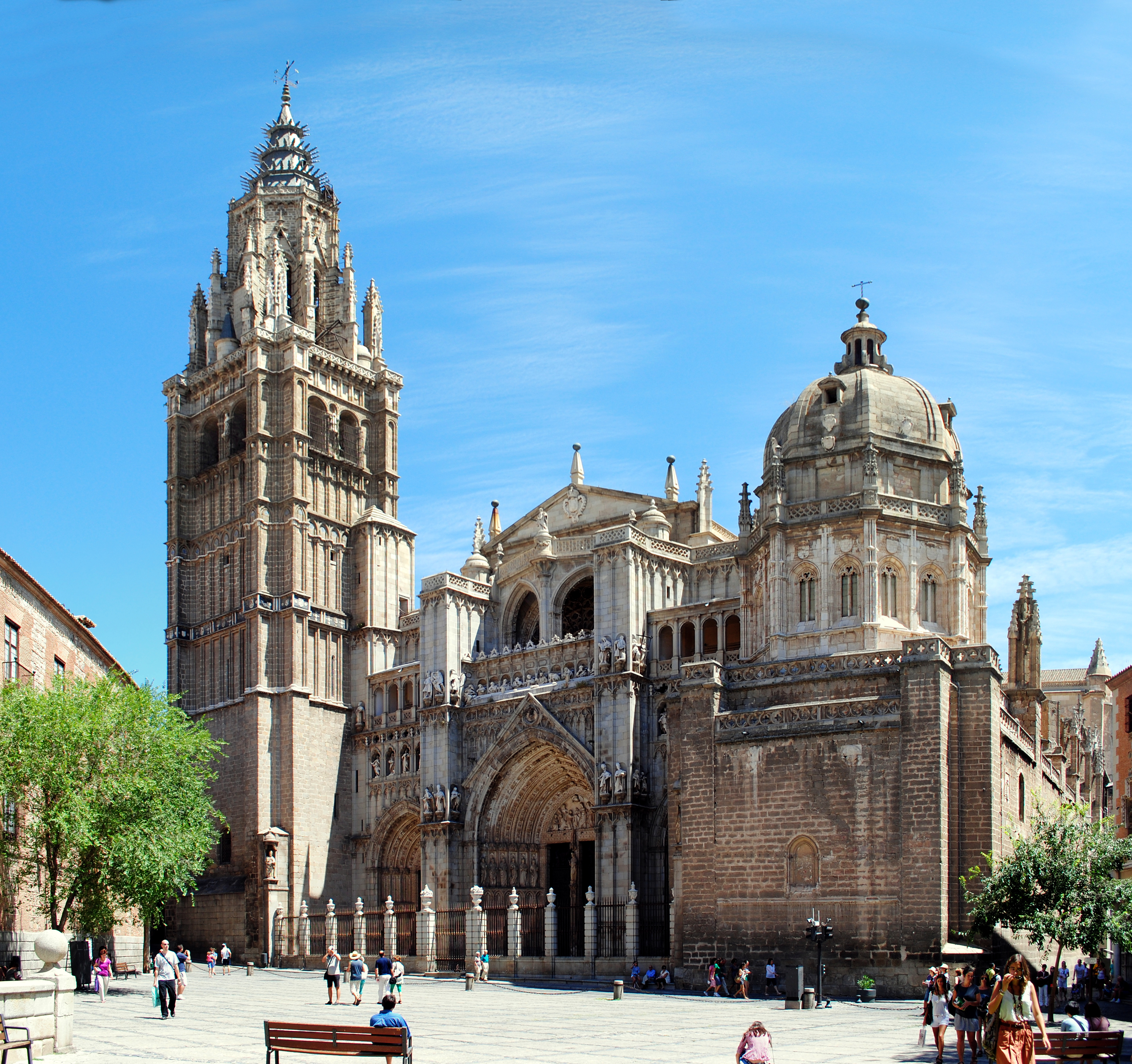
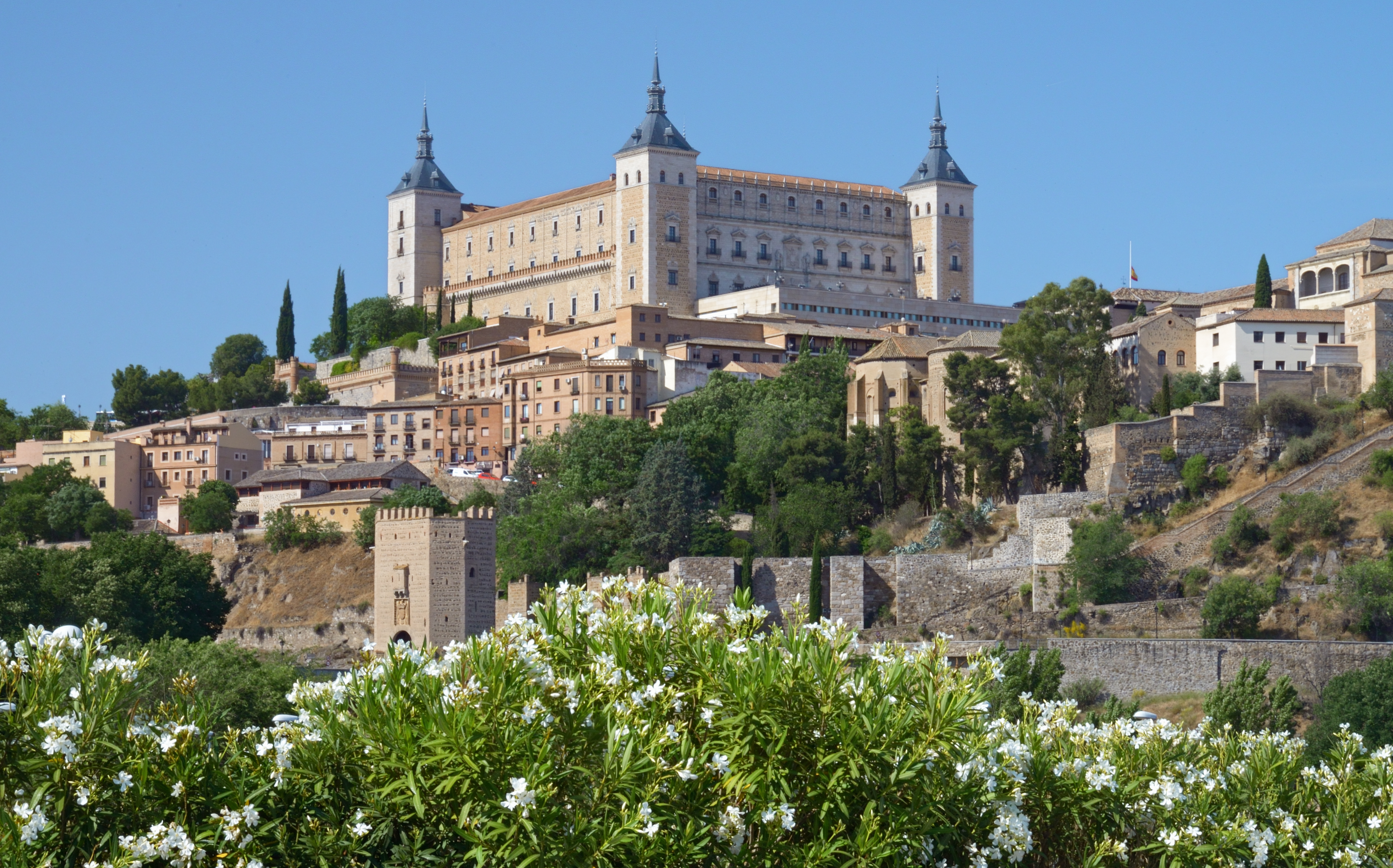
- Toledo and the Tagus River Cathedral Alcázar

- Flag Coat of arms
- Nicknames: La ciudad imperial (The Imperial City) and Ciudad de las Tres Culturas (City of the Three Cultures)
- Interactive map of Toledo
- Location within Castilla–La Mancha Location within Spain
- Coordinates: 39°51′24″N 4°1′28″W
- Country: Spain
- Autonomous Community: Castilla–La Mancha
- Province: Toledo

Government
  - Type: Ayuntamiento
  - Body: Ayuntamiento de Toledo
  - Mayor: Carlos Velázquez (PP)

Area
  - Land: 232.1 km^{2} (89.6 sq mi)
- Elevation: 529 m (1,736 ft)

Population (2025-01-01)
  - Total: 87,216
  - Density: 375.8/km^{2} (973.2/sq mi)
- Postcodes: 45001–45009
- Area code: +34 925
- Website: toledo.es

UNESCO World Heritage Site
- Official name: Historic City of Toledo
- Criteria: Cultural: i, ii, iii, iv
- Reference: 379
- Inscription: 1986 (10th Session)
- Area: 259.85 ha (642.1 acres)
- Buffer zone: 7,669.28 ha (18,951.2 acres)

Toledo (UK: /tɒˈleɪdoʊ/ tol-AY-doh; Spanish: [toˈleðo]) is a city and municipality in Spain. It is the capital of the province of Toledo and the de jure seat of the government and parliament of the autonomous community of Castilla–La Mancha.

Toledo is primarily located on the right (north) bank of the Tagus in central Iberia, nestled in a bend of the river.

Built on a previous Carpetanian settlement, Toledo developed into an important Roman city of Hispania, later becoming the capital of the Visigothic Kingdom and seat of a powerful archdiocese. Often unsubmissive to Umayyad central rule during the Islamic period, Toledo nonetheless acquired a status as a major cultural centre promoting productive cultural exchanges between the Islamic world and Latin Christendom, which it retained after the collapse of the caliphate and the creation of the Taifa of Toledo in the early 11th century. Following the Christian conquest in 1085, Toledo continued to enjoy an important status within the Crown of Castile and remained open to Muslim and Jewish influences for the next two centuries. In the early modern period, the economy stayed afloat for a while after the loss of political power to Madrid thanks to the silk industry, but Toledo entered a true decline in the 1630s, in the context of overall economic recession.

In the 21st century, population growth in the municipality has largely concentrated in the Santa María de Benquerencia (a.k.a. Polígono) district, a modern residential area detached from the historic centre located upstream on the left (south) bank of the Tagus. As of January 2024, the municipality had a population of 86,526. The municipality has an area of 232.1 km^{2} (89.6 sq mi).

The city has a Gothic cathedral and a long history in the production of bladed weapons, which are now commonly sold as souvenirs. Toledo was declared a World Heritage Site by UNESCO in 1986 for its extensive monumental and cultural heritage.

== Toponym ==
Over the centuries, the city has been known by various names: Toletum in Latin, Tulaytulah (طليطلة) in Arabic, Toldoth (טולדות) in Judaeo-Spanish, and Tolétho in Andalusi Romance. The earliest written reference to Toletum appears in the work of the Roman historian Livy, who suggested that the name derived from Tollitum, which evolved into Tollitu, Tollito, Tolleto, Tolledo, and eventually Toledo. The name is thought to mean 'raised' or 'elevated'. An alternative interpretation, cited by Martín Gallego, attributes the name to the "double bends or meanders formed by the river that surrounds it." The 12th-century writer Abu Abd Allah al-Ayyubi claimed that Tulaytulah (طليطلة), the Arabic name for the city, means 'the joyful', though he offered no further explanation. Jewish tradition derives the name from the Hebrew toledot (תולדות, 'generations' or 'histories') or tulaytula ('wandering' or 'migration'), associating it with Jewish exiles who are said to have settled in the area following the destruction of Jerusalem in AD 70.

The name Toledo has been adopted by five cities in the United States—located in the states of Ohio, Illinois, Oregon, Iowa, and Washington—as well as by other localities in Canada, Belize, Brazil, Portugal, Colombia, the Philippines, and Uruguay. In Spain, there are four additional places bearing the name in the provinces of Huesca, Ourense, Asturias, and Tenerife.

One of Toledo's epithets, "The City of Three Cultures", refers to a historical period during which Christians, Jews, and Muslims coexisted in the city. However, this label has been described as "grandiose" and is often attributed to politicians and tourism promoters. Critics argue that the myth of peaceful religious coexistence masks a more complex history marked by religious oppression.

== Coat of arms ==
The town was granted arms in the 16th century, which were based on the coat of arms of the King of Spain by special royal privilege.

== History ==
=== Roman era and late antiquity ===
Toledo (Latin: Toletum) is described by the Roman historian Livy (ca. 59 BC – 17 AD) as urbs parva, sed loco munita ("a small city, but fortified by location"). Roman general Marcus Fulvius Nobilior fought a battle near the city in 193 BC against a confederation of Celtic tribes, defeating them and capturing a king called Hilermus. At that time, Toletum was a city of the Carpetani tribe in the region of Carpetania. It was incorporated into the Roman Empire as a civitas stipendiaria (a tributary city of non-citizens) and later as a municipium. With this status, city officials obtained Roman citizenship for public service, and the forms of Roman law and politics were increasingly adopted. At approximately this time, a Roman circus, city walls, public baths, and a municipal water supply and storage system were constructed in Toletum.

The Roman circus in Toledo was one of the largest in Hispania. The circus could hold up to 15,000 spectators. A fragmentary stone inscription records circus games paid for by a citizen of unknown name to celebrate his achieving the sevirate, a kind of priesthood conferring high status. Games were held in the circus late into the 4th and early 5th centuries, an indication of active city life and ongoing patronage by wealthy elites.

Toledo started to gain importance in late antiquity. There are indications that large private houses (domus) within the city walls were enlarged, while several large villas were built north of the city through the 3rd and 4th centuries. Church councils were held in Toledo in the years 400 and 527 to discuss the conflict with Priscillianism. In 546 (or possibly earlier), Visigoth rulers installed the capital of their kingdom in Toledo. King Theudis was in Toledo in 546, where he promulgated the only law of which records remain from the period, known from a single manuscript.

Throughout the 7th century, a series of further church councils—the so-called Councils of Toledo—attempted to reconcile differing theological views and enacted anti-Jewish laws. By the end of the 7th century, the bishop of Toledo was the leader of all other bishops in Hispania, a situation unusual in Europe. The city was also unmatched as a symbolic center of monarchy.

When internal divisions developed among the Visigothic nobles, Tariq bin Ziyad captured Toledo in 711 or 712 on behalf of the Umayyad Caliphate of Damascus as part of the Islamic conquest of the Iberian Peninsula. Tariq's superior, Governor Musa, disembarked in Cádiz and proceeded to Toledo, where he executed the Visigothic nobles, destroying much of the existing power structure.

=== Middle Ages ===
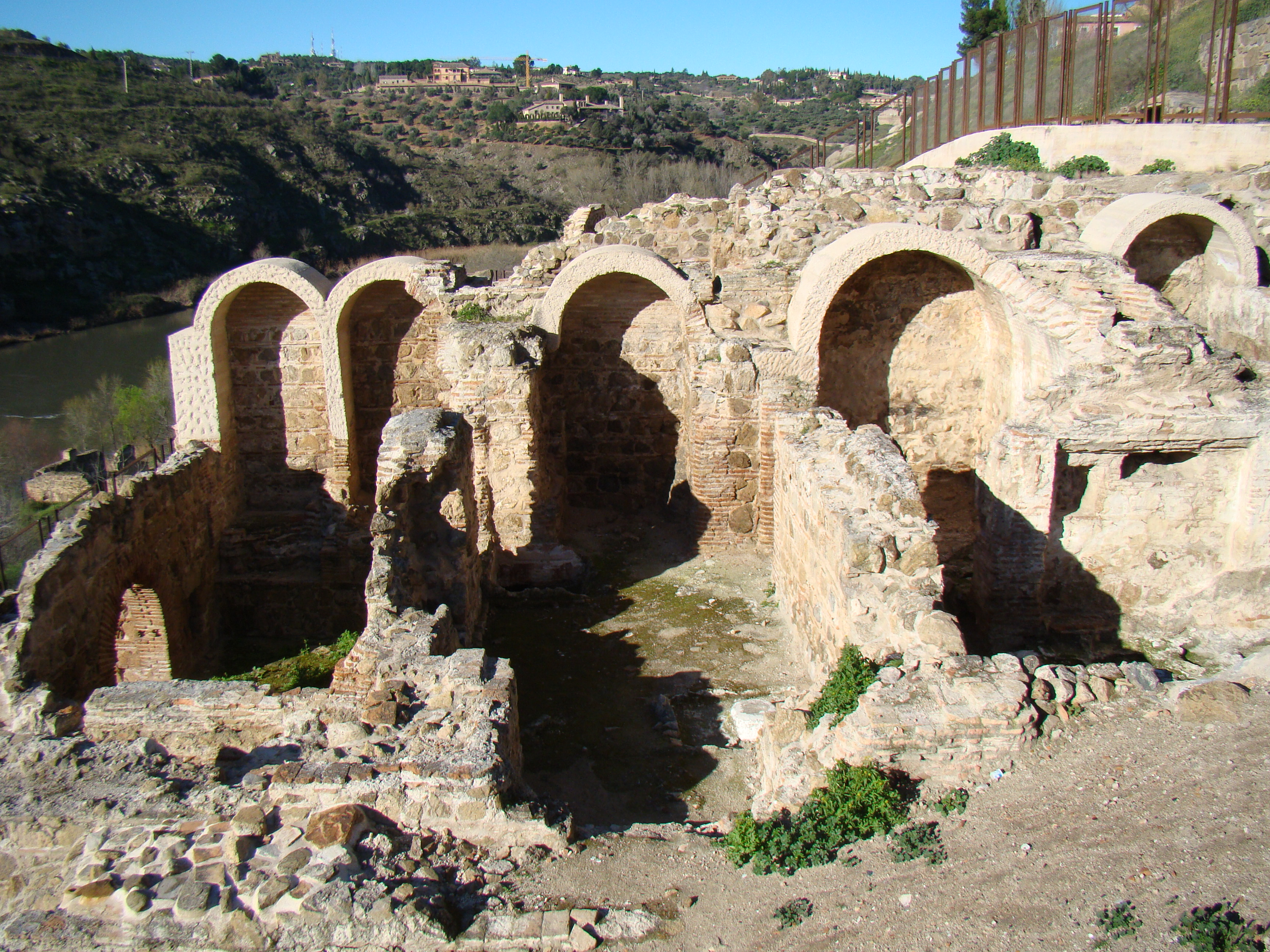
Baños de Tenerías, one of the Muslim baths in the city

Following the Umayyad conquest, invaders were ethnically diverse, and available evidence suggests that in the area of Toledo (known as Tulaytilah in Arabic), Berber settlement predominated over Arab. In 742, the Berbers in Al-Andalus rebelled against the Arab Umayyad governors. They took control of the north and unsuccessfully laid siege to the city.

The city retained its importance as a literary and ecclesiastical centre well into the mid-8th century, as the Chronicle of 754 demonstrated. During this period, several letters show of the primacy that the church of Toledo held. (Note: "Not only were its clerics still well enough equipped in intellectual terms to provide authoritative guidance on a wide range of ecclesiastical discipline and doctrine, but this was also actively sought.")

Under the Umayyad emirate of Cordoba, Toledo was the centre of numerous insurrections against the Cordoban government from 761 to 857. Girbib ibn Abdallah, a poet from Toledo, wrote verses against the Umayyads, helping to inspire a revolt in the city against the new emir in 797. By the end of the 8th century, the Umayyads had made Toledo the administrative center of the Central March of Al-Andalus. In 852, a new revolt broke out in Toledo. The Umayyad governor was held hostage to secure the return of Toledan hostages held in Córdoba. In reprisal for a prior attack by Toledans, Emir Muhammad I sent an army to attack them but was defeated. Toledo allied with King Ordoño I of Asturias. They fought together at the Battle of Guadacelete but lost. Later in 857, the Toledans attacked Talavera but were again defeated. In 859, Muhammad I negotiated a truce with Toledo. Though locked in conflict with neighboring cities, the city became virtually independent for twenty years. Cordoban authorities re-asserted control over Toledo in 873, after the successful Umayyad siege on the city, which forced defenders to submit. The Banu Qasi gained nominal control of Toledo until 920. A new period of unruliness followed in the 920 and 930s, until Caliph Abd-ar-Rahman III captured the city in 932 after an extensive siege.

Territory controlled by the Taifa of Toledo circa 1037

In the wake of the early 11th-century Fitna of al-Andalus, Toledo became the centre of an independent polity, the so-called Taifa of Toledo, under the rule of the Dhu l-Nunids. The population of Toledo at this time was about 28,000, including a Jewish population of 4,000. The Mozarab community had its own Christian bishop. The taifa was centered on the Tagus and bordered Sierra de Guadarrama, Guadalajara, Medinaceli, the Taifa of Valencia and the Mountains of Toledo.

The taifa, however, fell into political disarray, owing to the economic draining caused by the parias (tributes) imposed by the Kingdom of León as well as territorial mutilations, and so a revolt erupted in 1079, which was followed by the Aftasid ruler of Badajoz taking control of the city.

On 25 May 1085, Alfonso VI of León took Toledo and established direct personal control over the city from which he had been exacting tribute. Around that time, the city's demographics featured a heterogeneous composition, with Mozarabs, Muslims, and Jews, to which incoming Christians from northern Iberia and Frankish elements were added. Initially, therefore, different fueros were simultaneously in force for each community. After the Christian conquest, the city's Mozarab community grew by immigration from the Muslim south.

Toledo preserved its status as a cultural centre. A translation centre was established in which books in Arabic or Hebrew would be translated into Castilian by Muslim and Jewish scholars, and from Castilian into Latin by Castilian scholars, thus letting long-lost knowledge spread through Christian Europe again. Under the Roman Catholic archdiocese of Toledo, multiple persecutions (633, 653, 693) and burnings at the stake of Jews (638) occurred; the Kingdom of Toledo followed up on this tradition with forced conversions and mass murder (1368, 1391, 1449, 1486–1490) and rioting and bloodbath against the Jews of Toledo (1212).

A major popular revolt erupted in 1449, with elements of tax mutiny, anti-Jewish and anti-converso sentiment, and appeals to the civic community, eventually expanding from an urban revolt to anti-seigneurial riots in countryside settlements outside the city.

=== Modern era ===
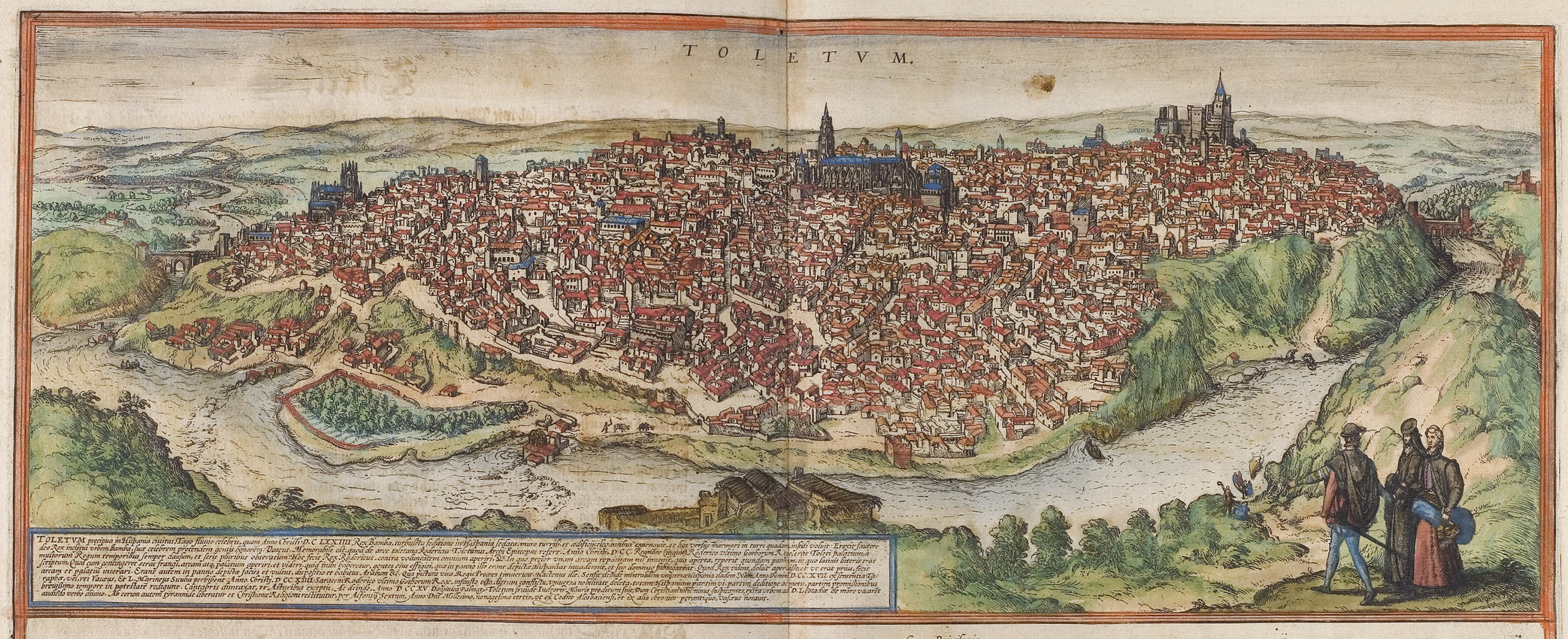
Toledo as depicted in the Civitates orbis terrarum (1572)

During the persecution of the Jews in the late 15th and early 16th centuries, members of the local Jewish community produced texts on their long history in Toledo. After the crushing of the Revolt of the Comuneros, Charles V's court was installed in Toledo, with the monarch choosing the city as his residence at least 15 times from 1525 on. Charles granted the city a coat of arms. From 1528 to 1561 the population increased from 31,930 to 56,270. In 1561, during the first years of his son Philip II's reign, the royal court was moved to Madrid.

The archbishops of Toledo remained powerful brokers in the political and religious affairs of Spain for the rest of the Ancien Régime, also owning large amounts of seigneurial land across most of the southern half of the Inner Plateau and some nearby territories.

The mass arrival of deported unruly Moriscos from Granada ('moriscos nuevos') in Toledo and its lands (6,000 arrived to the city only, at least temporarily) in the wake of the Alpujarras rebellion posed a formidable logistic challenge, and the uneasy preexisting system of social relations between the moros viejos ('old Moors') and the Old Christians was disrupted. By and large, Granadan new Moriscos were subject to xenophobic abuse and became stigmatised as bloodthirsty and sacrilegious.

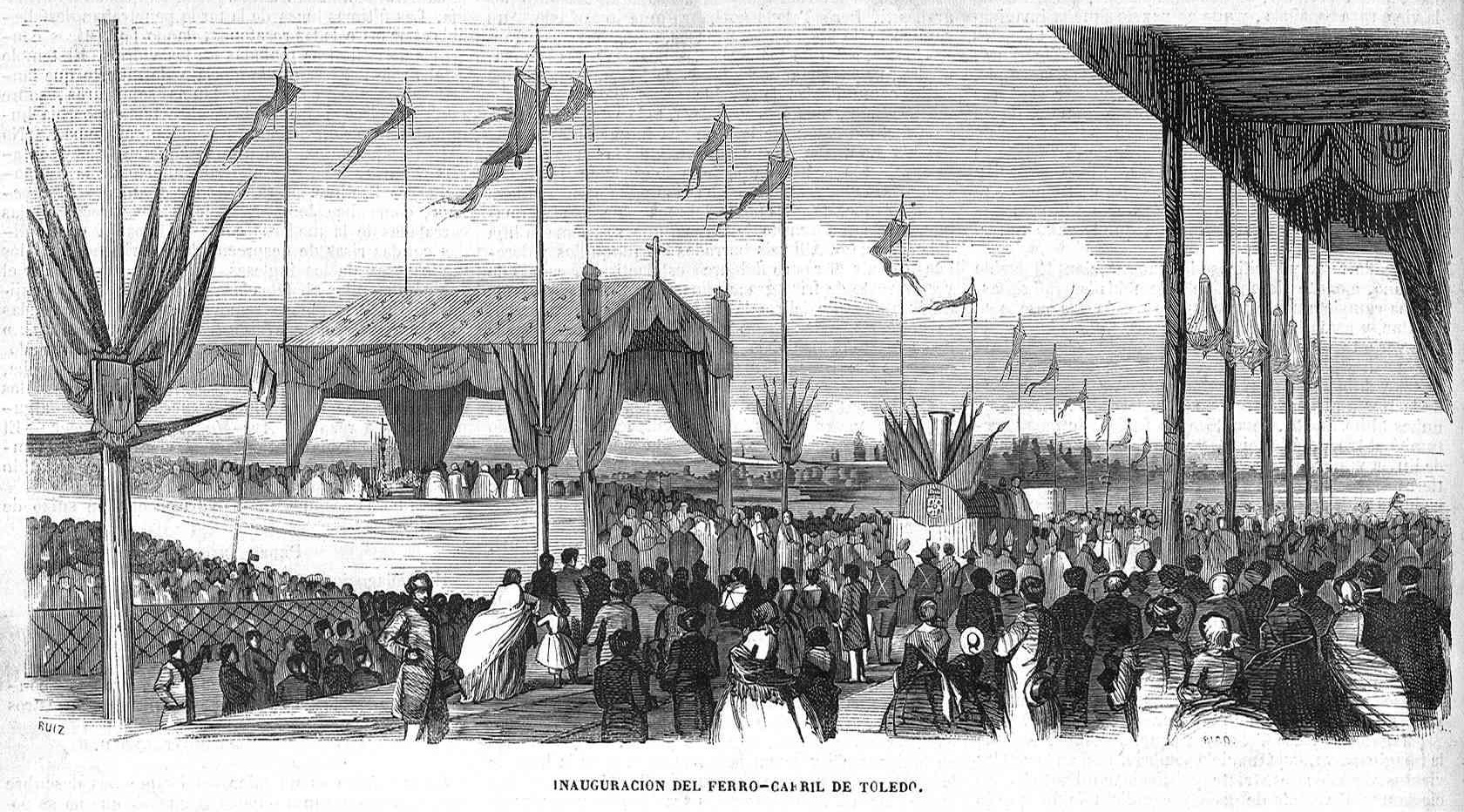
Opening of the railway in Toledo in June 1858

The city excelled in silk manufacturing during the early modern period. The silk industry reached a peak in the 16th century, entering a protracted decline in the later years of that century and ultimately disappearing by the turn of the 19th century.

The Peninsular War affected the city in a very negative way. Over the 19th century, Toledo underwent a progressive change from a convent city to a bureaucratic city. The city being quite impervious to external influence at the time, the bourgeoisie exerted a limited influence.

Following the exclusion of Toledo from the railway to the Portuguese border in the 1850s, the construction of a rail connection from Castillejo to Toledo promoted by the Marquis of Salamanca was approved in June 1856. The line was opened on 12 June 1858. Tourism fostered by the arrival of rail contributed to the development of the hospitality industry in the late 19th century. By the turn of the 20th century, Toledo's population stood at about 23,000. The neighborhood of Santa Bárbara came into existence after the arrival of rail.

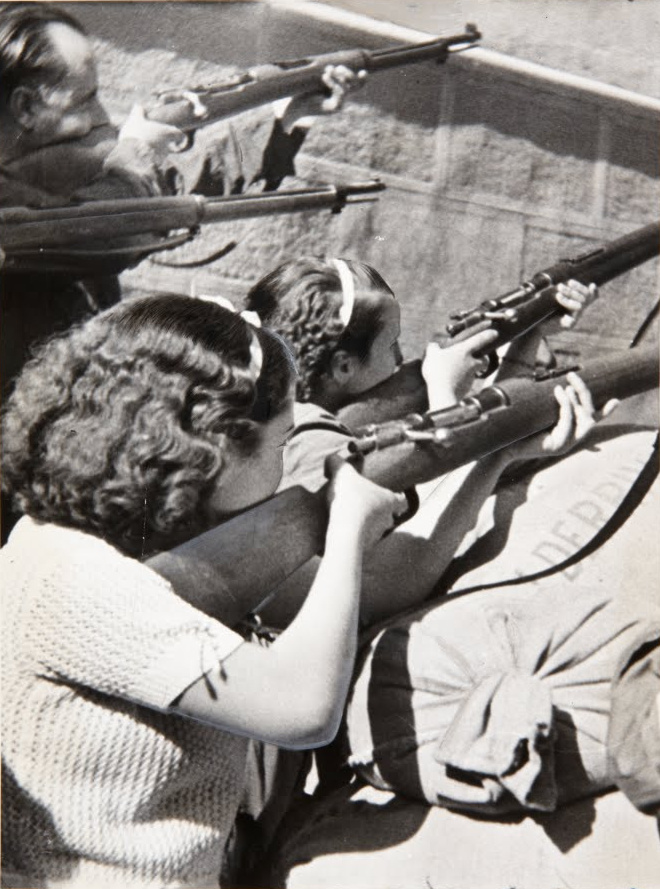
Republican militia women besieging the Alcázar, controlled by the Nationalist faction

Following the July 1936 coup d'etat in Spain, the acting military commander in Toledo, José Moscardó, refused to provide weapons to Madrid and hid instead in the Alcázar with a garrison of about 1,000 rebels, food, ammunition and some hostages. After 21 July, they became subject to an unsuccessful siege by forces loyal to the Republic during the early stages of the Spanish Civil War. Leading rebel general (and soon-to-be dictator of Spain) Francisco Franco and his Army of Africa took a detour from their advance towards Madrid (which gave the Republicans time to build up the defenses in Madrid and receive early foreign support) and lifted the siege of the Alcázar in late September 1936. The two months of resistance of the garrisoned rebel military would become a core symbol of the mythology built around the Francoist regime and its ideology.

By 1950, the population was around 40,243. Urban planning vis-à-vis the development of the neighborhoods of Palomarejos and Polígono ensued in the second half of the 20th century.

In the 1980s, in the context of the creation of the autonomous communities in Spain, Toledo became the de facto capital of the autonomous community of Castilla–La Mancha, hosting the seat of the Cortes of Castilla–La Mancha (the regional legislature) and the presidency of the regional government (the executive).

Toledo continues to be a major tourist destination, attracting visitors from around the world who come to see historic landmarks, such as the Toledo Cathedral, the Alcázar, and the city's many synagogues and mosques.

Toledo hosts numerous cultural events and festivals, such as Semana Santa (Holy Week) processions and the Corpus Christi festival, which draw large crowds and celebrate Castilian Spanish religious and cultural traditions.

== Climate ==
Toledo has a typical cold semi-arid climate (Köppen: BSk). Winters are cool, while summers are hot and dry. Precipitation is low and mainly concentrated in the period between mid-autumn and mid-spring. The highest temperature ever recorded in Toledo was 44.2 °C (111.6 °F) on 13 August 2021; the lowest was −13.4 °C (7.9 °F) on 12 January 2021.

Climate data for Toledo, Spain, altitude 515 metres (1,690 feet) (1991–2020), extremes (1982–present)
Month	Jan	Feb	Mar	Apr	May	Jun	Jul	Aug	Sep	Oct	Nov	Dec	Year
Record high °C (°F)	22.0 (71.6)	23.8 (74.8)	29.0 (84.2)	34.5 (94.1)	38.0 (100.4)	42.0 (107.6)	42.9 (109.2)	44.2 (111.6)	41.3 (106.3)	34.1 (93.4)	26.2 (79.2)	22.2 (72.0)	44.2 (111.6)
Mean daily maximum °C (°F)	11.9 (53.4)	14.3 (57.7)	18.1 (64.6)	20.5 (68.9)	25.2 (77.4)	31.1 (88.0)	35.1 (95.2)	34.5 (94.1)	29.1 (84.4)	22.6 (72.7)	15.8 (60.4)	12.0 (53.6)	22.5 (72.5)
Daily mean °C (°F)	6.8 (44.2)	8.4 (47.1)	11.7 (53.1)	14.1 (57.4)	18.4 (65.1)	23.7 (74.7)	27.2 (81.0)	26.8 (80.2)	22.1 (71.8)	16.6 (61.9)	10.7 (51.3)	7.3 (45.1)	16.2 (61.1)
Mean daily minimum °C (°F)	1.7 (35.1)	2.6 (36.7)	5.2 (41.4)	7.7 (45.9)	11.6 (52.9)	16.3 (61.3)	19.3 (66.7)	19.1 (66.4)	15.0 (59.0)	10.5 (50.9)	5.5 (41.9)	2.5 (36.5)	9.8 (49.6)
Record low °C (°F)	−13.4 (7.9)	−9.0 (15.8)	−5.8 (21.6)	−2.6 (27.3)	−0.3 (31.5)	4.3 (39.7)	10.0 (50.0)	10.0 (50.0)	5.4 (41.7)	0.0 (32.0)	−5.6 (21.9)	−8.0 (17.6)	−13.4 (7.9)
Average precipitation mm (inches)	25.3 (1.00)	24.6 (0.97)	33.0 (1.30)	39.5 (1.56)	38.9 (1.53)	18.7 (0.74)	5.7 (0.22)	8.6 (0.34)	20.7 (0.81)	48.7 (1.92)	37.7 (1.48)	35.9 (1.41)	337.3 (13.28)
Average precipitation days (≥ 1 mm)	4.8	4.6	5.1	6.1	5.8	2.7	1.0	1.5	3.0	6.5	5.8	5.9	52.8
Average relative humidity (%)	75	67	59	56	51	41	34	37	48	63	73	77	57
Mean monthly sunshine hours	152	184	229	261	298	351	391	360	273	217	162	136	3,014
Percentage possible sunshine	51	61	62	65	67	78	86	85	73	63	54	46	66
Source: Agencia Estatal de Meteorología (AEMET OpenData)

Climate data for Toledo, Spain, altitude 515 metres (1,690 feet) (1982–2010)
Month	Jan	Feb	Mar	Apr	May	Jun	Jul	Aug	Sep	Oct	Nov	Dec	Year
Mean daily maximum °C (°F)	11.5 (52.7)	14.0 (57.2)	18.1 (64.6)	19.9 (67.8)	24.2 (75.6)	30.5 (86.9)	34.6 (94.3)	34.0 (93.2)	29.0 (84.2)	22.1 (71.8)	15.6 (60.1)	11.6 (52.9)	22.1 (71.8)
Daily mean °C (°F)	6.4 (43.5)	8.3 (46.9)	11.6 (52.9)	13.5 (56.3)	17.6 (63.7)	23.2 (73.8)	26.8 (80.2)	26.3 (79.3)	22.0 (71.6)	16.1 (61.0)	10.5 (50.9)	7.1 (44.8)	15.8 (60.4)
Mean daily minimum °C (°F)	1.3 (34.3)	2.6 (36.7)	5.0 (41.0)	7.2 (45.0)	11.0 (51.8)	15.9 (60.6)	18.9 (66.0)	18.6 (65.5)	14.9 (58.8)	10.2 (50.4)	5.3 (41.5)	2.5 (36.5)	9.5 (49.0)
Average precipitation mm (inches)	26.0 (1.02)	25.0 (0.98)	23.0 (0.91)	39.0 (1.54)	44.0 (1.73)	24.0 (0.94)	7.0 (0.28)	9.0 (0.35)	18.0 (0.71)	48.0 (1.89)	39.0 (1.54)	41.0 (1.61)	342.0 (13.46)
Average precipitation days (≥ 1.0 mm)	4.9	4.7	3.9	6.4	6.4	2.9	1.0	1.5	2.9	6.8	5.9	6.3	53.6
Average snowy days	0.6	0.5	0.3	0	0	0	0	0	0	0	0.1	0.2	1.7
Average relative humidity (%)	76.0	69.0	59.0	58.0	54.0	45.0	39.0	41.0	51.0	66.0	74.0	79.0	59.0
Mean monthly sunshine hours	151	172	228	249	286	337	382	351	260	210	157	126	2,922
Source: Agencia Estatal de Meteorología

== Demographics ==
Historical population

Year	Pop.	±%
1842	13,580	—
1857	17,275	+27.2%
1877	20,331	+17.7%
1887	19,817	−2.5%
1900	23,375	+18.0%
1910	22,745	−2.7%
1920	26,175	+15.1%
1930	26,907	+2.8%
1940	31,467	+16.9%

Year	Pop.	±%
1950	38,136	+21.2%
1960	40,660	+6.6%
1970	44,190	+8.7%
1981	54,335	+23.0%
1991	59,802	+10.1%
2001	68,382	+14.3%
2011	83,872	+22.7%
2021	85,254	+1.6%

Source: INE

== Economy ==
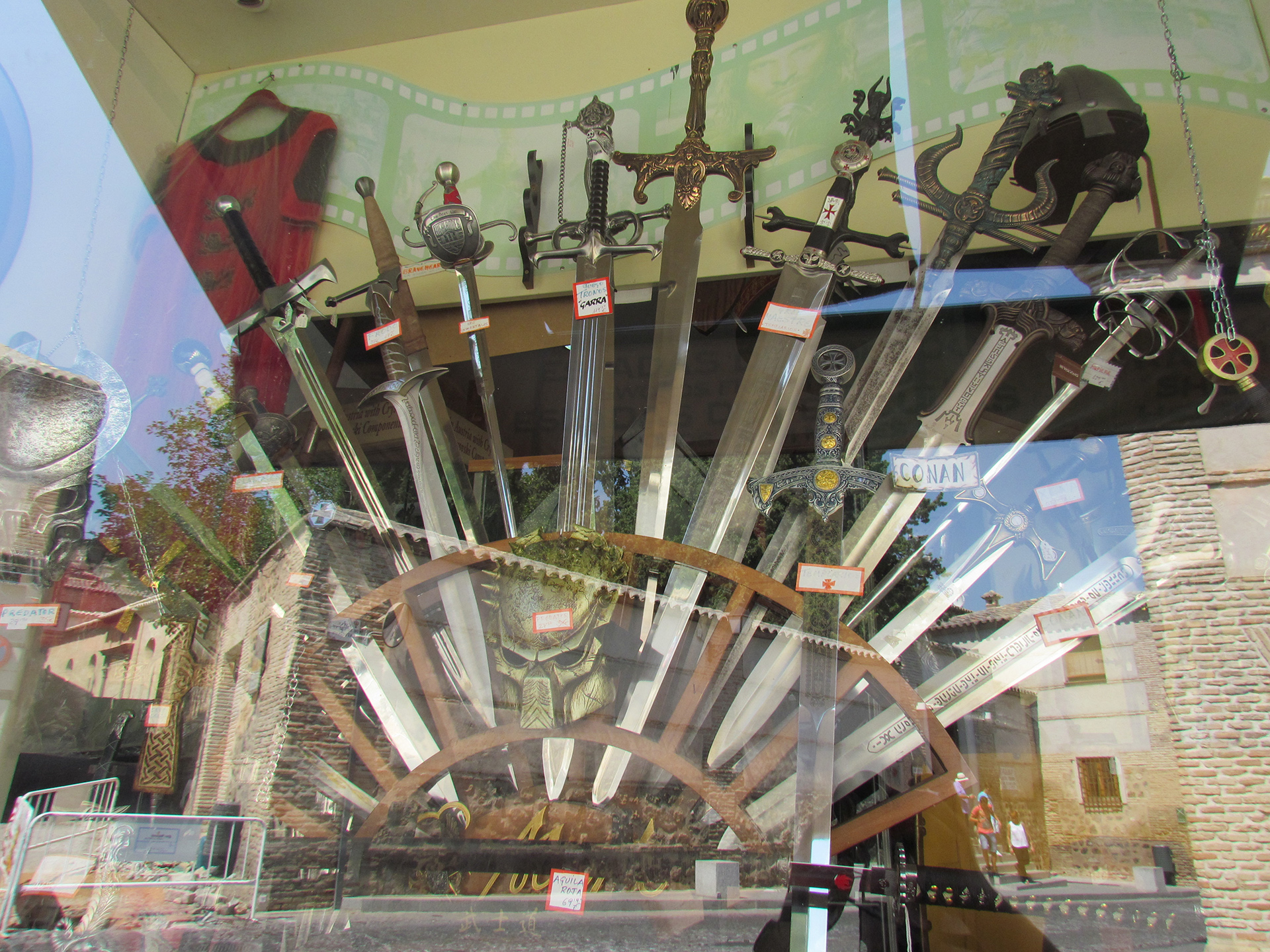
The manufacture and selling of swords was affected by the decrease in tourism caused by the COVID-19 pandemic.

The metal-working industry has historically been Toledo's economic base, with a great tradition in the manufacturing of swords and knives and a significant production of razor blades, medical devices, and electrical products. Soap and toothpaste industries, flour milling, glass, and ceramics have also been important.

The manufacture of swords in the city of Toledo goes back to Roman times, but it was under Moorish rule and during the Reconquista that Toledo and its guild of swordsmiths played a key role. Between the 15th and 17th centuries, the Toledo sword-making industry enjoyed a great boom, to the point where Toledo steel came to be regarded as the best in Europe. Swords and daggers were made by individual craftsmen, although the sword-makers guild oversaw their quality. In the late 17th and early 18th century, production began to decline, prompting the creation of the Royal Arms Factory in 1761 by order of King Charles III. The Royal Factory brought together all the sword-makers' guilds of the city and was located in the former mint. In 1777, recognizing the need to expand the space, Charles commissioned the architect Sabatini to construct a new building on the outskirts of the city. This was the beginning of several phases of expansion. Its importance was such that it eventually developed into a city within the city of Toledo.

In the 20th century, the production of knives and swords for the army was reduced to cavalry weapons only, and, after the Spanish Civil War, to the supply of swords to the officers and NCOs of the various military units. Following the closure of the factory in the 1980s, the building was renovated to house the campus of the Technological University of Castilla–La Mancha in Toledo. According to the Statistical Institute of Castilla–La Mancha, in 2007 the share of employment by sector was as follows: 86.5% of the population engaged in the services, 6.6% in construction, 5.4% in industry and 1.5% in agriculture and livestock.

=== Unemployment ===
In the decade up to 2008, unemployment in absolute terms remained fairly stable in the city of Toledo, but in 2009 this figure increased significantly: nearly 62% higher than 2008, with the number of unemployed rising from 2,515 to 4,074 (figures at 31 March each year), according to the Junta de Comunidades de Castilla La Mancha. Of this 62%, one-third of the increase took place in the first quarter.

According to other statistics from the same source, almost half the unemployed in the city of Toledo (1,970 persons) are among those whose education does not go beyond the compulsory secondary level. However, there are groups whose level of studies is such that they have not been registered as unemployed, including those who have completed class 1 professional training, or those with virtually nonexistent unemployment rates (less than 0.1%), which is the case of the unemployed with high school degrees or professional expertise.

The largest group among the unemployed is those who have no qualifications (27.27%).

== Politics ==
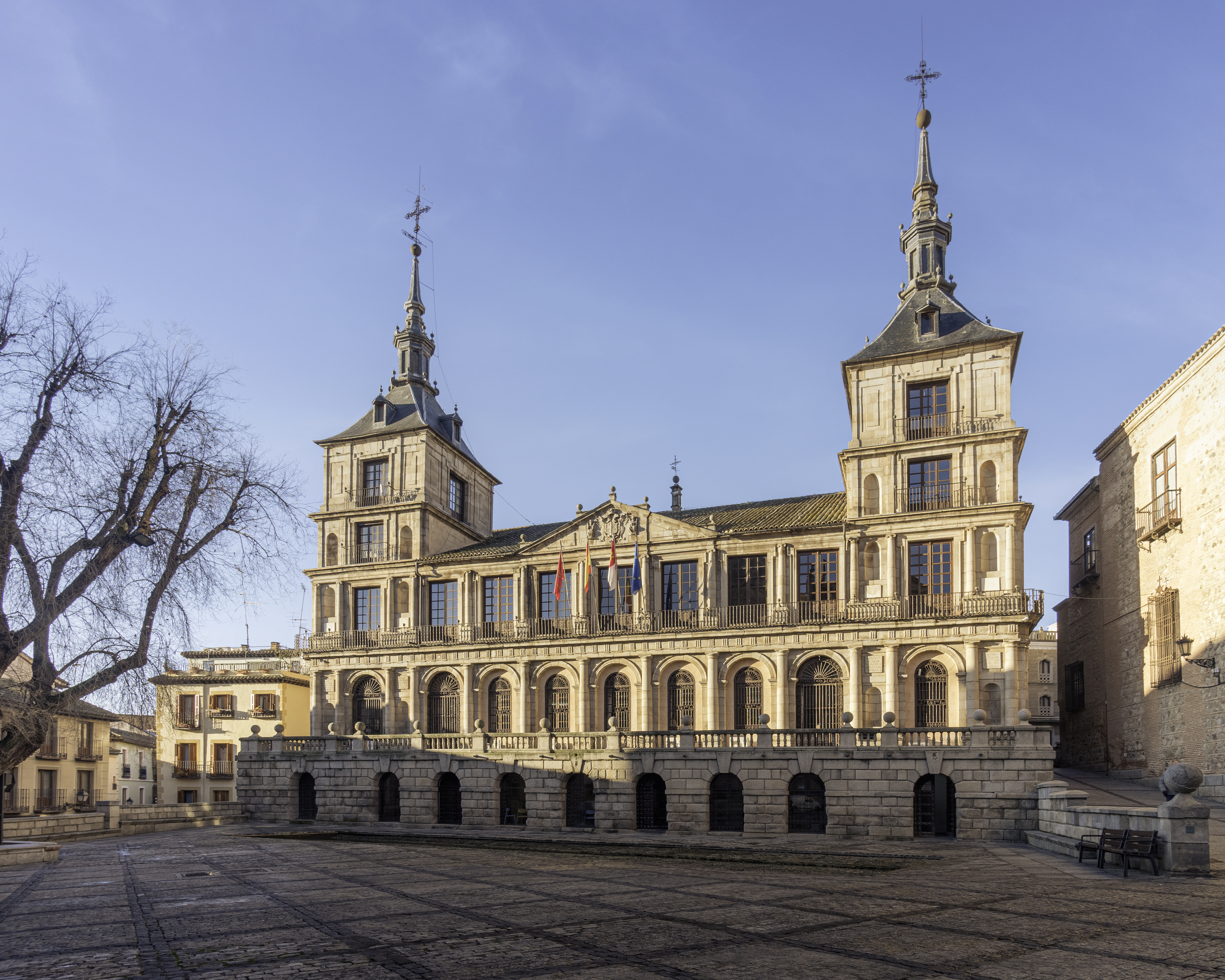
Toledo City Hall

Toledo has a 25-member City Council, elected by closed lists every four years. The 2023 election saw a pact between the 9 members of the People's Party and the 4 members of Vox, allowing Carlos Velázquez of the PP to become mayor, a position which had been held by the Socialists since 2007.

== Culture ==
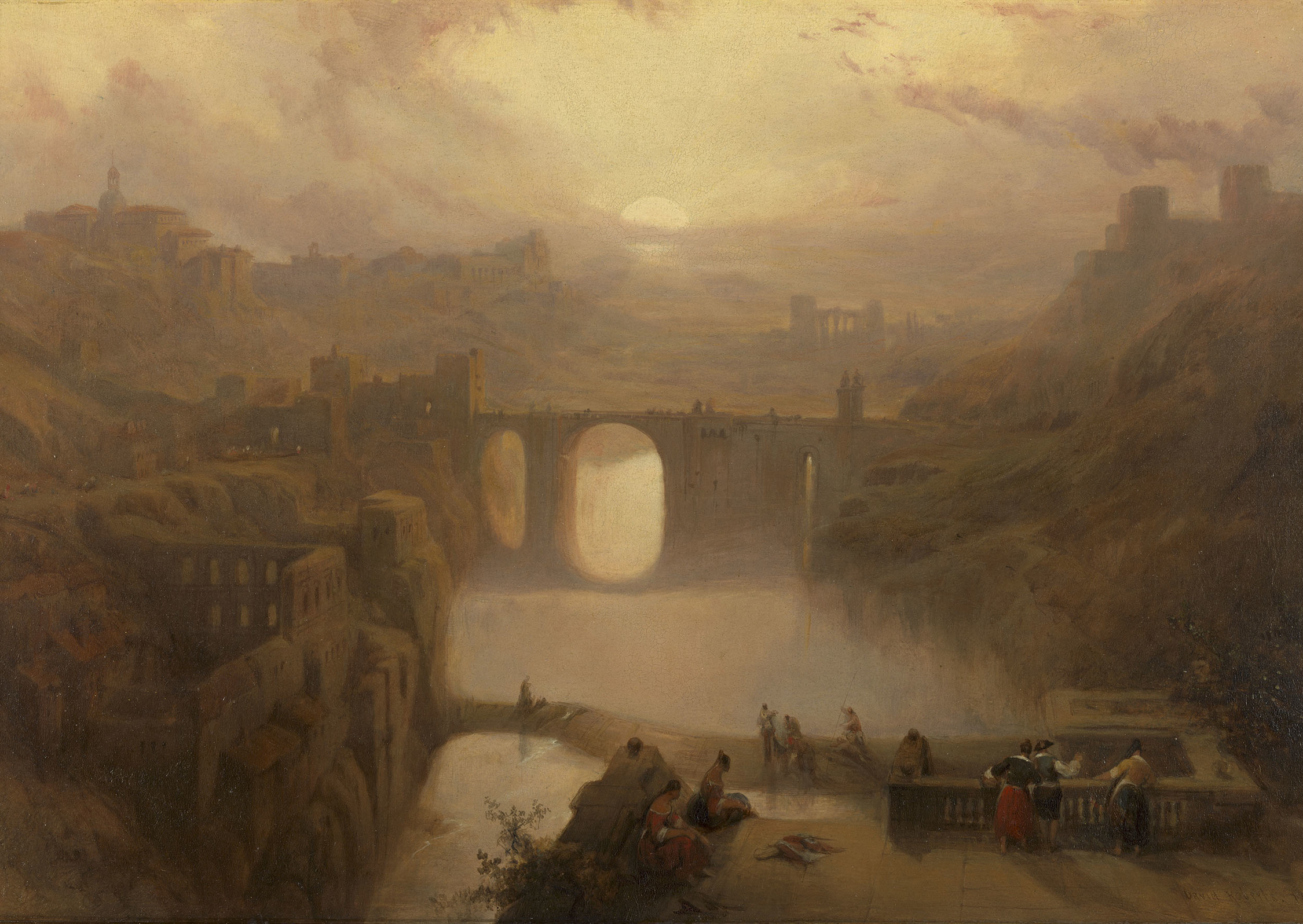
A View of Toledo and the River Tagus by David Roberts, 1841

The old city is located on a mountaintop with a 150-degree view, surrounded on three sides by a bend in the Tagus River, and contains many historical sites, including the Alcázar, the cathedral (the primate church of Spain), and the Zocodover, a central market place.

From the 4th century to the 16th century, about thirty synods were held at Toledo. The earliest, directed against Priscillian, was assembled in 400. At the synod of 589, the Visigothic king Reccared declared his conversion from Arianism to Catholicism; the synod of 633 decreed uniformity of Catholic liturgy throughout the Visigothic Kingdom and took stringent measures against baptized Jews who had relapsed into their former faith. Other councils forbade circumcision, Jewish rites, and observance of the Sabbath and festivals. Throughout the seventh century, Jews were flogged, executed, had their property confiscated, were subjected to ruinous taxes, forbidden to trade, and, at times, dragged to the baptismal font. The council of 681 assured to the archbishop of Toledo the primacy of Spain. At Guadamur, very close to Toledo, the Treasure of Guarrazar was excavated in 1858, the best example of Visigothic art in Spain.

As nearly one hundred early canons of Toledo found a place in the Decretum Gratiani, they exerted an important influence on the development of ecclesiastical law. The synod of 1565–1566 concerned itself with the execution of the decrees of the Council of Trent, and the last council held at Toledo, 1582–1583, was guided in detail by Philip II.

Toledo had large communities of Muslims and Jews until they were expelled from Spain in 1492 (Jews) and 1502 (Mudéjars). Today's city contains the religious monuments the Synagogue of Santa María la Blanca, the Synagogue of El Tránsito, the Mosque of Cristo de la Luz and the Church of San Sebastián dating from before the expulsion, still maintained in good condition. Among Ladino-speaking Sephardi Jews, in their various diasporas, the family name Toledano is still prevalent, indicating ancestry from the city (the name is also attested among non-Jews in various Spanish-speaking countries).

In the 13th century, Toledo was a major cultural centre under the guidance of Alfonso X, known as "El Sabio" ("the Wise") for his love of learning. The Toledo School of Translators, established under Archbishop Raymond of Toledo, continued to bring vast stores of knowledge to Europe by rendering great academic and philosophical works in Arabic into Latin. The Palacio de Galiana, built in the Mudéjar style, is one of the monuments remaining from that period.

The Cathedral of Toledo (Catedral de Toledo) was built between 1226 and 1493 and modeled after Bourges Cathedral, though it also combines some characteristics of the Mudéjar style. It is remarkable for its incorporation of light and features a Baroque altar called El Transparente, several storeys high, with fantastic figures of stucco, paintings, bronze castings, and several colors of marble, a masterpiece of medieval mixed media by Narciso Tomé. For a few minutes every day, a shaft of light shines through, from which this feature of the cathedral derives its name. The Mozarabic Chapel in the Toledo Cathedral still uses the Mozarabic Rite and music. Two notable bridges secured access to Toledo across the Tagus, the Alcántara bridge and the later built San Martín bridge.

The Monasterio de San Juan de los Reyes is a Franciscan monastery, built 1477–1504, in a remarkable combination of Gothic-Spanish-Flemish style with Mudéjar ornamentation.

Toledo was home to El Greco for the latter part of his life, and is the subject of some of his most famous paintings, including The Burial of the Count of Orgaz, exhibited in the Church of Santo Tomé.

When Philip II moved the royal court from Toledo to Madrid in 1561, the old city went into a slow decline from which it never recovered.

=== Toledo steel ===
Toledo has been a traditional sword-making, steel-working centre since about 500 BCE, and came to the attention of Rome when used by Hannibal in the Punic Wars. Soon, it became a standard source of weaponry for Roman legions.

Toledo steel was famed for its very high quality alloy, whereas Damascene steel, a competitor from the Middle Ages on, was also famed for a specific metal-working technique.

Today there is a significant trade, and many shops offer all kinds of swords to their customers, whether historical or modern swords used in films, as well as armor from the medieval period and other times, which are also exported to other countries.

=== Gastronomy ===
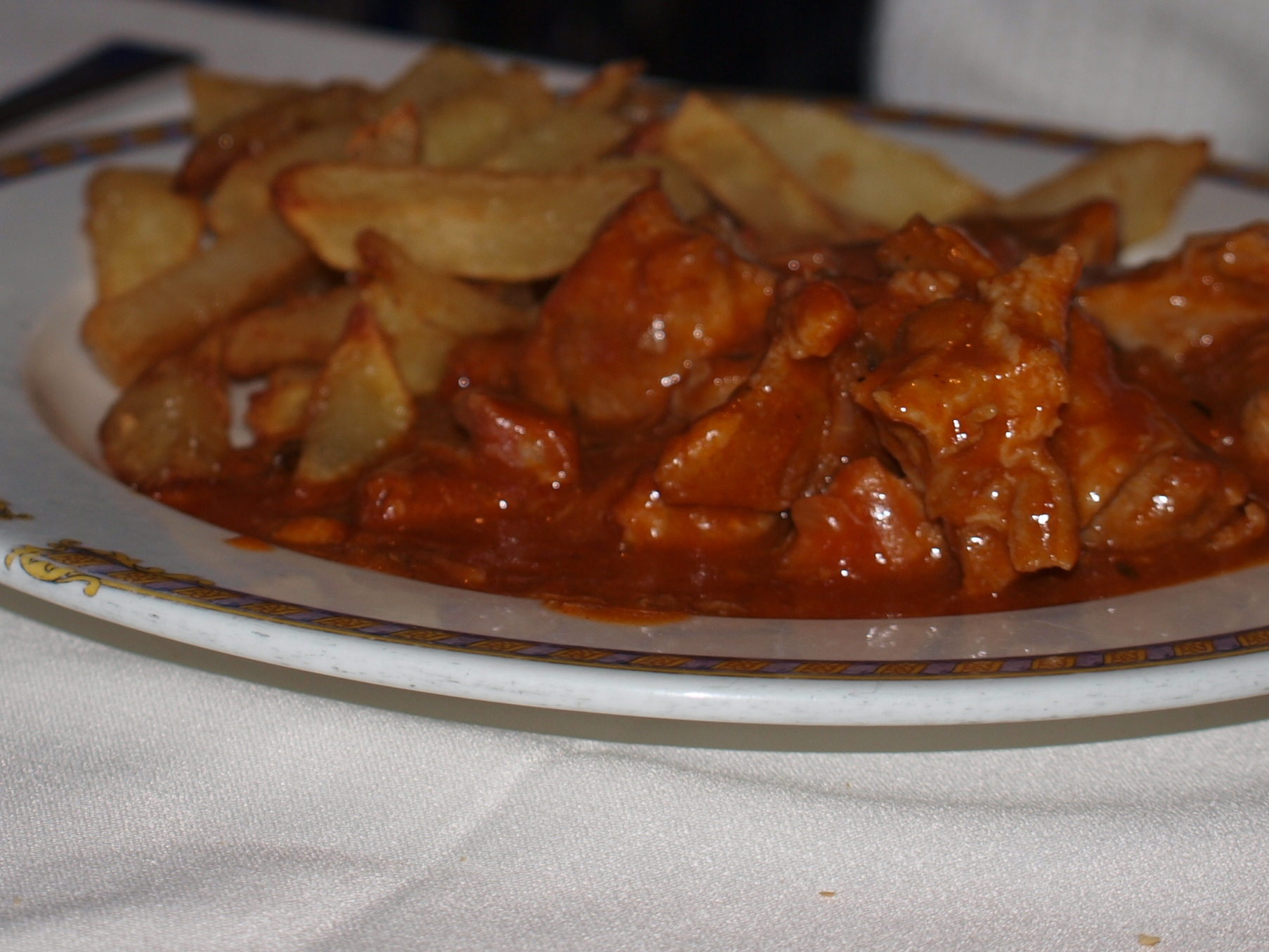
Carcamusas (made of lean pork with seasonal vegetables) are considered a local specialty.

Some of the local specialties include lamb roast or stew, cochifrito, alubias con perdiz (beans with partridge) and perdiz estofoda (partridge stew), carcamusa, migas, gachas manchegas, and tortilla a la magra. In addition, there are local versions of dishes from the nearby capital of Spain, Madrid, as is the case of the cocido toledano. Two of the city's most famous food products are Manchego cheese and marzipan, which has a Protected Geographical Indication (mazapán de Toledo).

=== Holidays ===
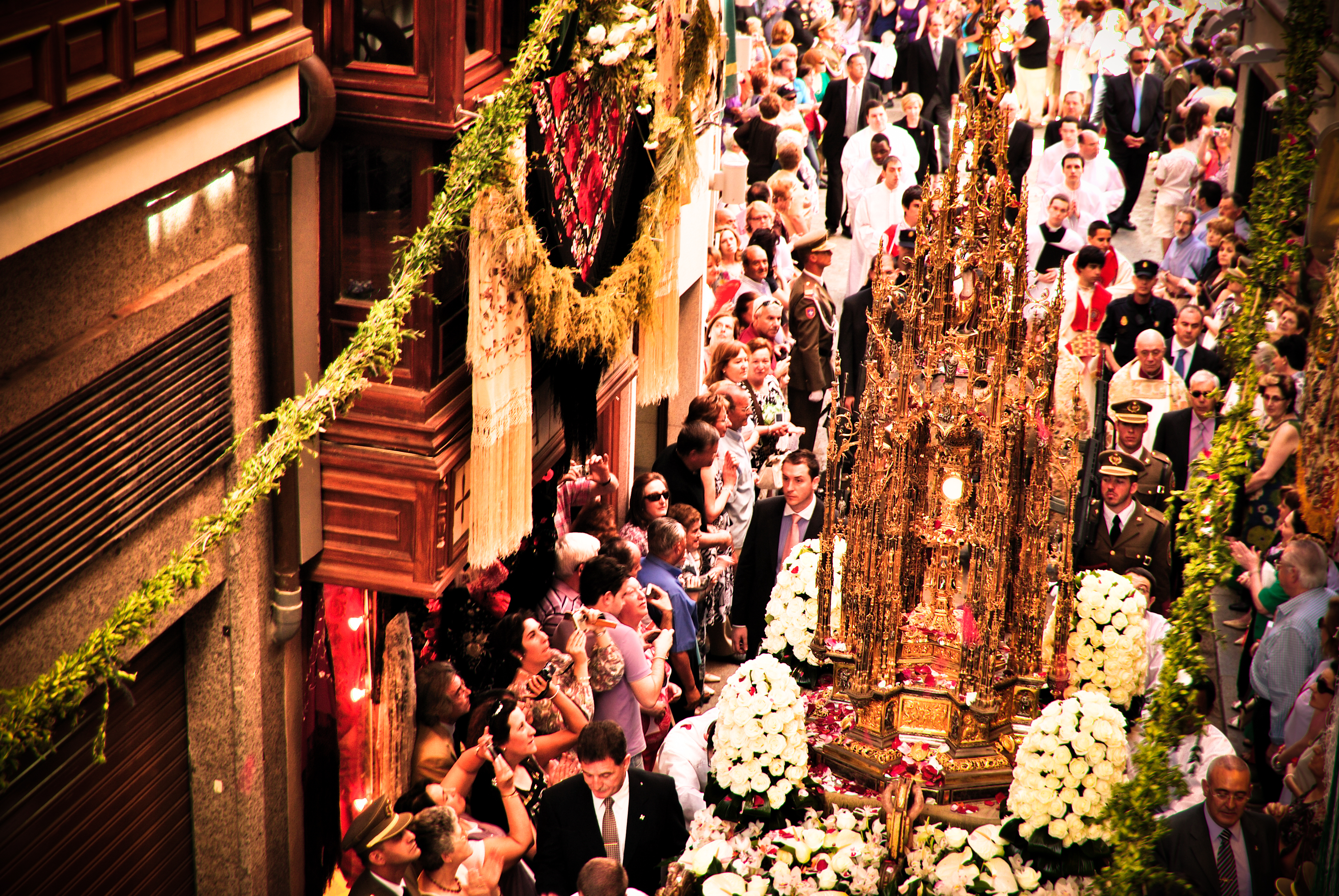
2010 Feast of Corpus Christi

The Virgen del Valle pilgrimage is celebrated on May 1 at the Ermita de la Virgen del Valle, a popular spot for visitors. Holy Week, which has been declared of National Tourist Interest, is marked in spring with various processions (including several on Good Friday) and religious and cultural events. The local feast of Corpus Christi has held the status of celebration of International Tourist Interest since 1980. It was conventionally celebrated 60 days after Easter Sunday. The celebration of Catholic feasts had its heyday during the Baroque, post-Trent period. A processional cortege travels around two kilometres (1.2 miles) of streets and richly decorated awnings. The Virgen del Sagrario is celebrated on 15 August, featuring a procession inside the Cathedral and drinking water of the Virgin from jars. Labour Day celebrations begin on the night of April 30.

== Main sights ==
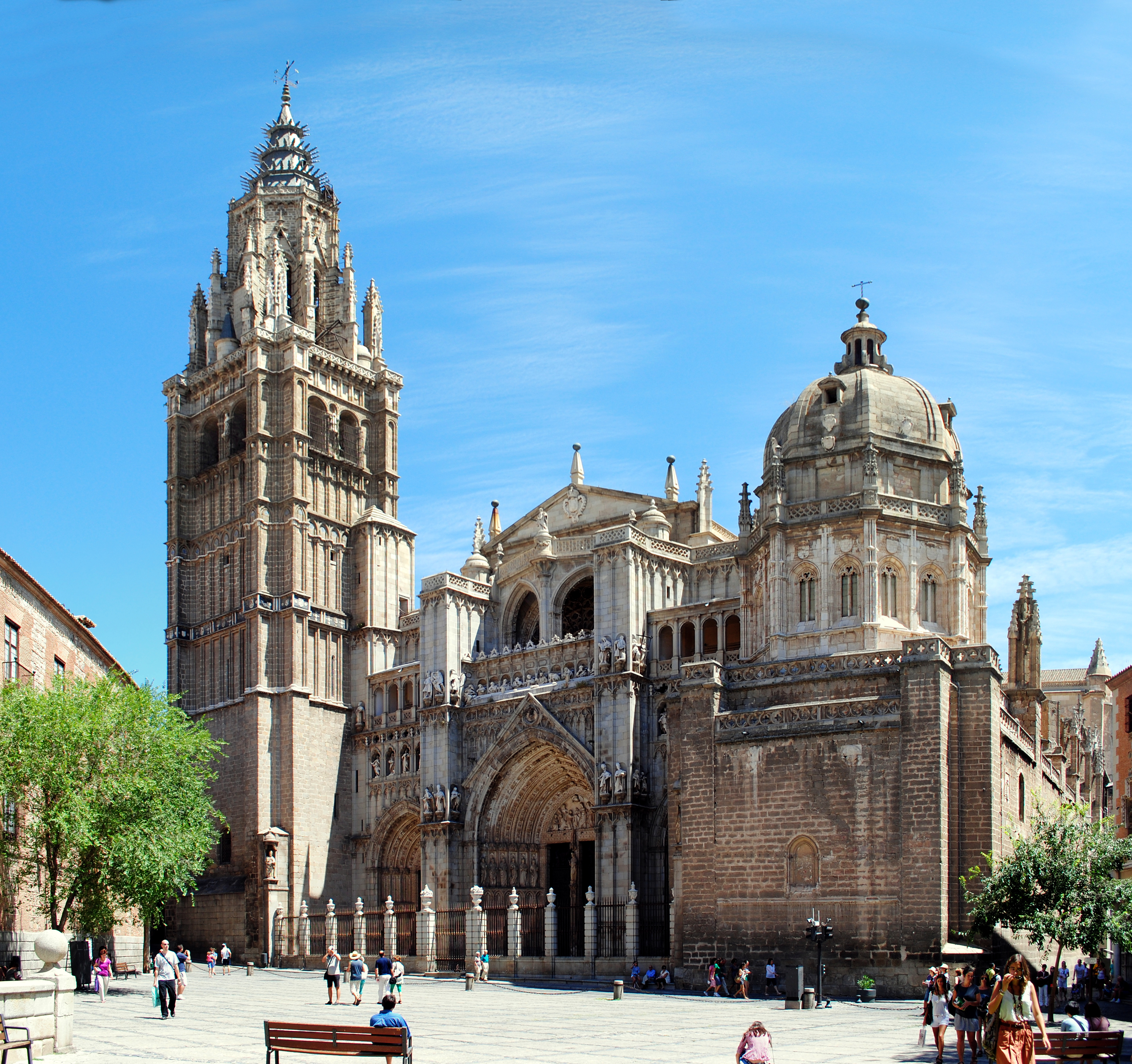
Cathedral of Saint Mary of Toledo

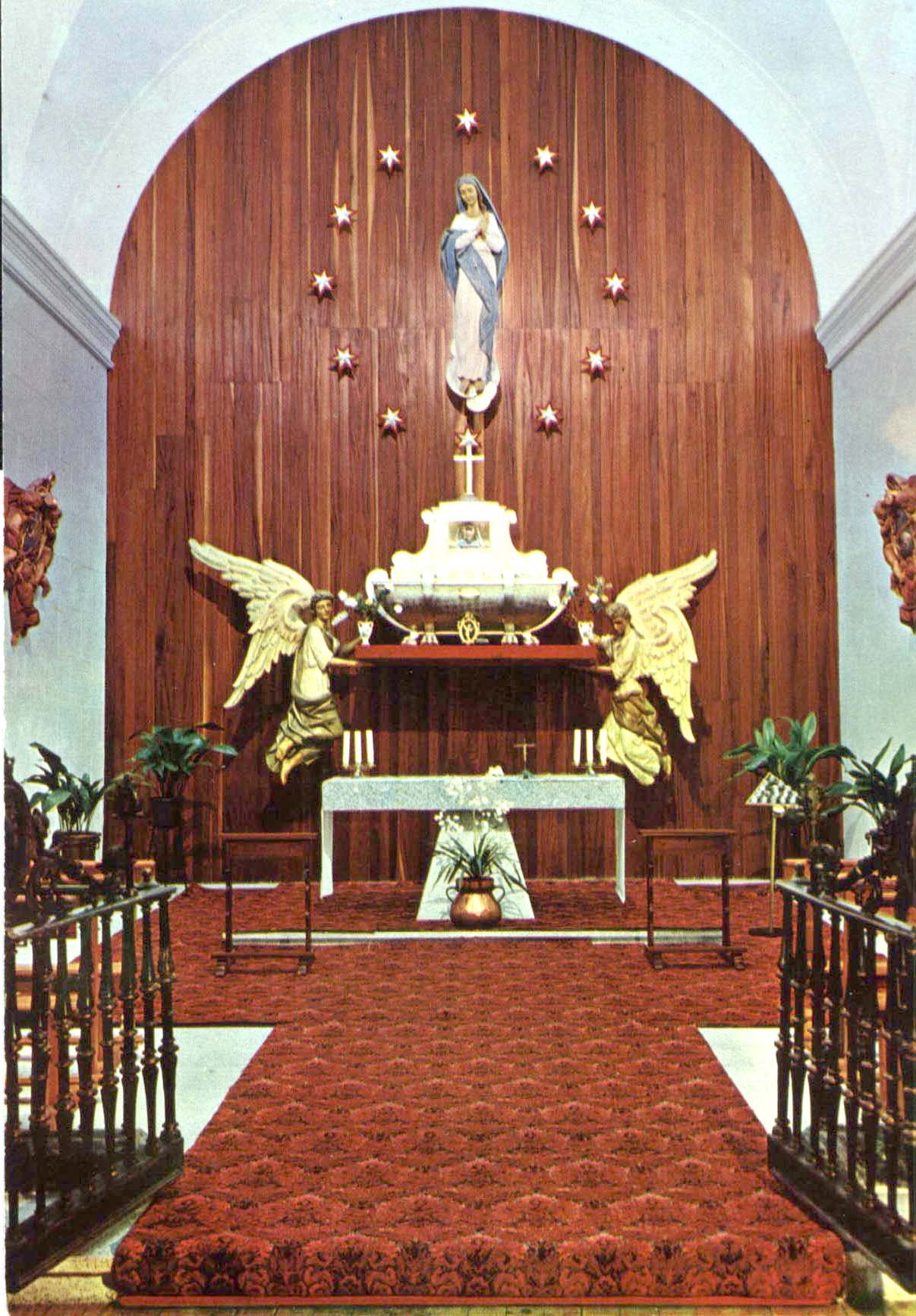
The tomb of Saint Beatrice of Silva

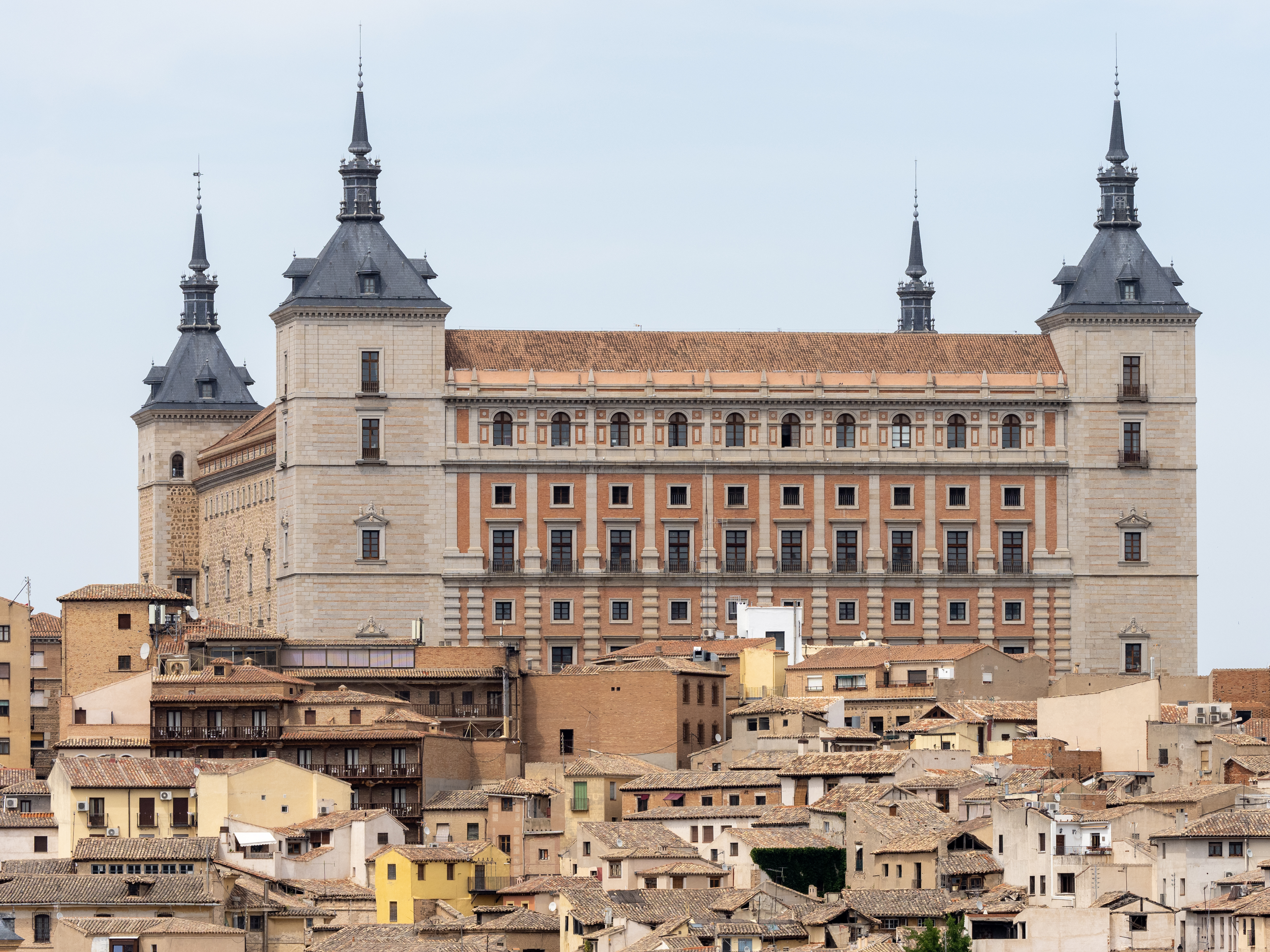
The Alcázar of Toledo

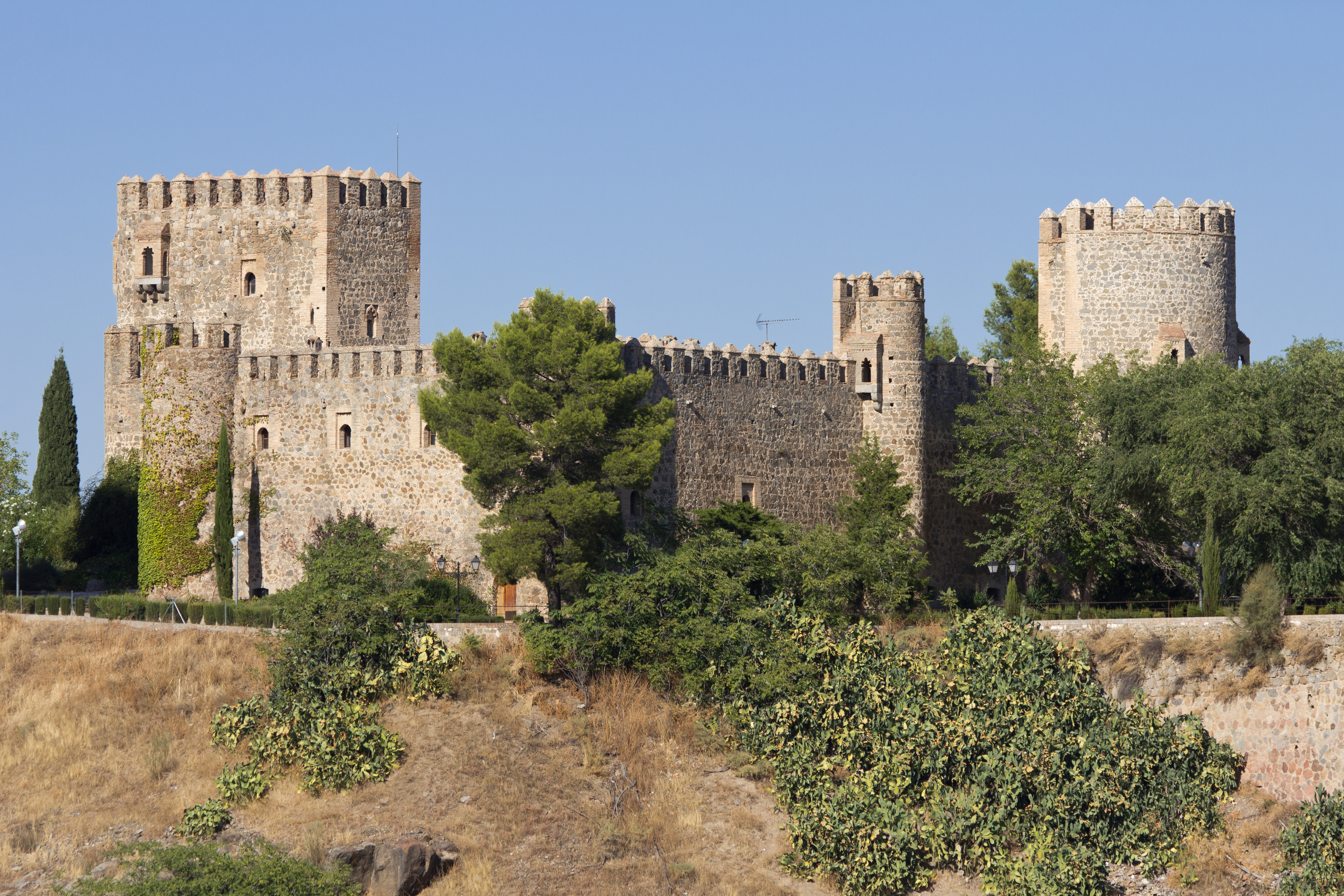
Castle of San Servando, formerly occupied by the Knights Templar

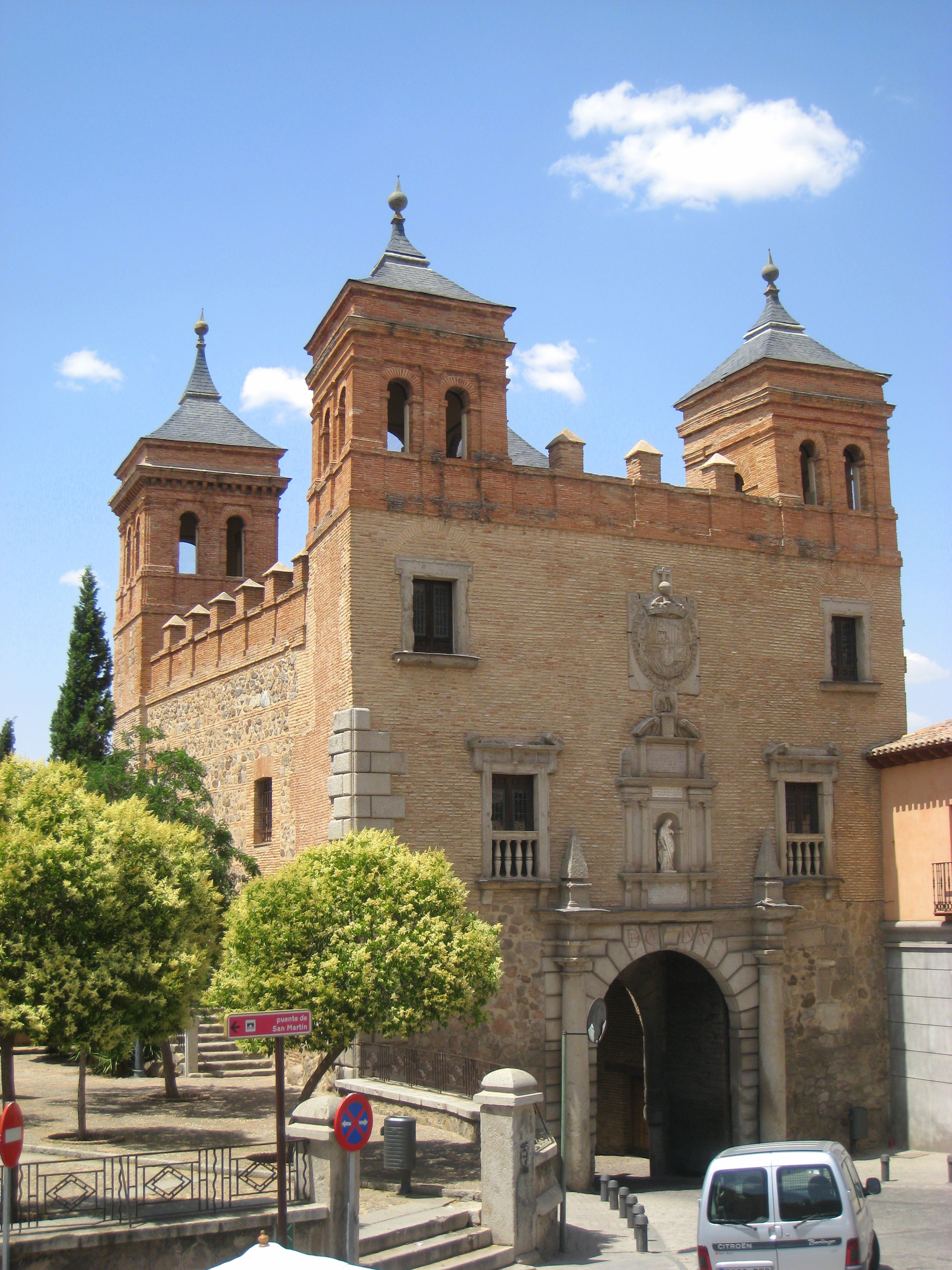
Puerta del Cambrón, completed in 1576

The city of Toledo was declared a Historic-Artistic Site in 1940. UNESCO later gave the city the title of World Heritage in 1987. Sights include:

- The tomb of Saint Beatrice of Silva, founder of the Order of the Immaculate Conception, at the Monastery of the Conceptionist nuns of Toledo.
- Posada de la Santa Hermandad, a type of military peacekeeping association of armed individuals, characteristic of municipal life in medieval Spain.
- Castle of San Servando, a medieval castle near the banks of the Tagus River and the Infantry Academy.
- The Gothic Cathedral of Saint Mary of Toledo, dating from the thirteenth century, is the second biggest cathedral in Spain. Inside is the Baroque altarpiece El Transparente, created by Narciso Tomé.
- Monasterio de San Juan de los Reyes, in Isabelline Gothic style (15th century).
- The Renaissance Museo-Hospital de Santa Cruz (16th century).
- El Greco Museum, a house-museum designed as a recreation of the artist's home, which was lost centuries ago. It houses several important paintings.
- Santa María la Blanca, the oldest synagogue building in Europe still standing, now owned by the Catholic Church.
- Synagogue of El Transito, in the Jewish Quarter. It is home to the Sephardic Museum.
- Hospital de Tavera Museum Duque de Lerma. Renaissance style, dating from the sixteenth century. Influenced the layout of El Escorial.
- Church of Santiago del Arrabal, in Mudéjar style.
- Iglesia de Santo Tome. Mudéjar style, from the fourteenth century; houses the famous Burial of Count Orgaz by El Greco.
- El Cristo de la Luz, a former small mosque-oratory built in 999, later extended with Mudéjar apse for conversion into a Catholic church.
- Galiana Palace (13th century), in Mudéjar style.
- Tornerías Mosque (11th century).
- Alcázar fortress (16th century), located in the highest part of town, overlooking the city. Since 2009 it has housed the collection of the Army Museum.
- Iglesia de San Andrés, with its crypt containing 60 mummies of infantes, dukes, nuns, and others, in a good state of preservation, open to visitors.
- Puerta Bab al-Mardum (10th century), the oldest city gate of Toledo.
- Puerta de Bisagra Antigua (10th century), the main entrance to the city in Andalusian times. Also known as "Puerta de Alfonso VI".
- Puerta del Sol (14th century), built by the Knights Hospitallers.
- Puerta de Bisagra Nueva (16th century), of Moorish origin re-built by Alonso de Covarrubias. The main entrance and face of Toledo today.
- Puerta del Cambrón, of Muslim origin, re-built in the 16th century.
- San Román (Museum of the Councils and Visigoth culture).
- Ermita del Cristo de la Vega, in Mudéjar style (11th century).
- Alcántara bridge, Roman bridge across the Tagus.
- Puente de San Martin, medieval bridge across the Tagus.

To mark the fourth centenary of the publication of the first part of Don Quixote, the Council of Communities of Castilla–La Mancha designed a series of routes through the region crossing various points cited in the novel. Known as the Route of Don Quixote, two of the designated pathways, sections 1 and 8, are based in Toledo; those linking the Castilian city with La Mancha and the Toledo Mountains take advantage of the natural route that passes through the Cigarrales and heads to Cobisa, Burguillos of Toledo and Nambroca, where it takes the Camino Real of Sevilla to suddenly turn towards Mascaraque Almonacid de Toledo, near Mora in La Mancha.

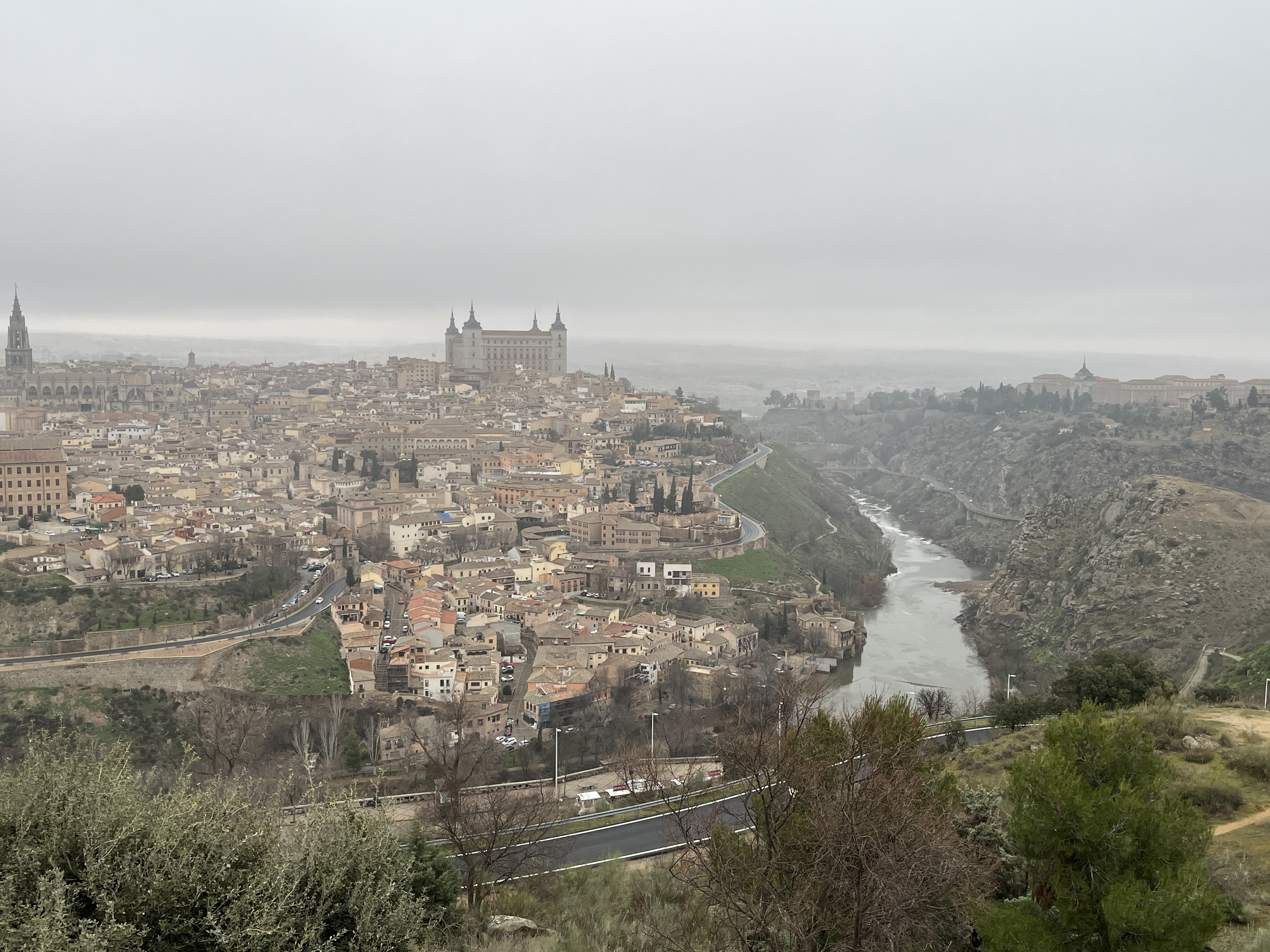
Civic Centers in Toledo

The Mascaraque-Toledo stretch of the Route of Don Quixote has recently been officially included in the Camino de Levante branch of the Camino de Santiago, starting in Valencia and passing through Alicante and Cartagena. Both routes on this stretch have been declared European Cultural Routes.

== Transport ==
Toledo has long been an obligatory stop in the centre of the peninsula. The roads leading to historic Toledo are still used and in many cases have provided the basis for existing roads leading into the city.

=== Roads ===
From Toledo, the N-400 links the city with Cuenca via Ocaña and Tarancón. It is currently in the process of transformation into the future A-40 Castilla–La Mancha motorway, which will link Maqueda (where it joins the Extremadura motorway), Toledo, Ocaña (where it attaches to the Motorway of Andalusia), Tarancón (where it connects with the Levante motorway), Cuenca and Teruel.

The old 401 National Road (Madrid-Toledo-Ciudad Real) was transformed in the late 1980s into the current A-42 as a result of splitting and removing the road that the various crossings included (Illescas, Yuncos, etc.).

The split path extends up to 7 kilometres (4 miles) south of Toledo, towards Ciudad Real, where it continues as a conventional road. At this point, the A-42 connects with the Highway of the Vineyard that goes as far as Tomelloso. There are plans to extend the A-42, by a toll road, to Ciudad Real and Jaén.

In the early twenty-first century, the toll motorway AP-41 was built, in order to reduce traffic congestion between Toledo and Madrid.

Toledo is also part of the N-403, Toledo–Maqueda–Ávila–Adanero State Highway Network. Part of the route of this road will be replaced by that of the aforementioned Castilla–La Mancha Highway.

In addition to these roads, several regional and provincial roads link the city with the regions of Montes de Toledo, La Jara, and La Mancha.

=== Rail ===
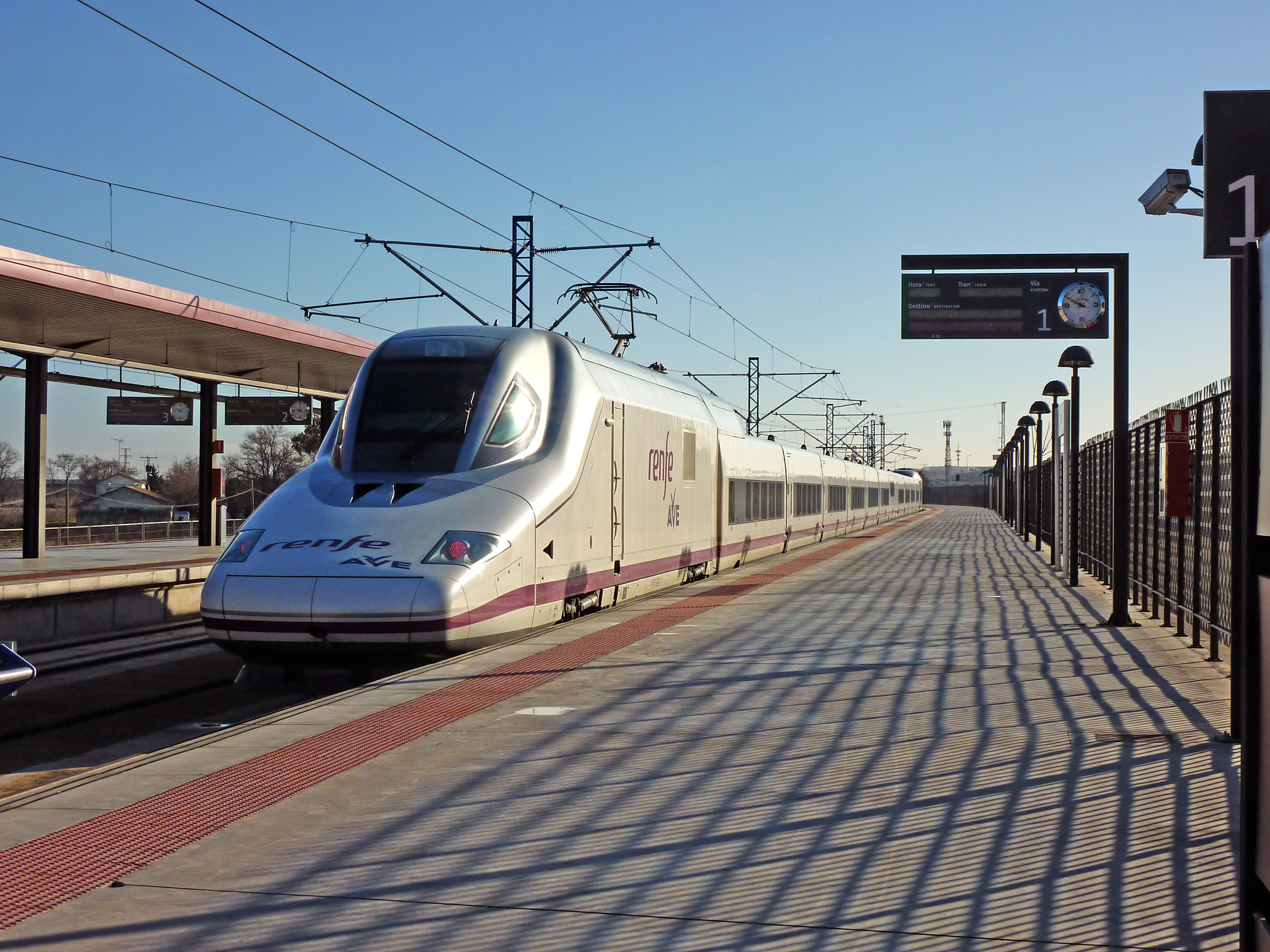
AVE class 112 entering the Toledo Railway Station

In the mid-nineteenth century, Toledo was one of the first Spanish cities to receive rail service, with the arrival of the Madrid – Aranjuez line, which was inaugurated by Isabella II on June 12, 1858. The current Toledo Railway Station, (built in Neo-Mudéjar style), was opened on April 24, 1919.

The line suffered some technical issues and service disruptions but continued to serve as the main intercity route until the early twenty-first century. On July 2, 2003, the last conventional train service between the two capitals ended and work began on a high-speed link to Madrid, which entered service on November 15, 2005. The new line reduced the travel time to Madrid to just under 30 minutes.

=== Air ===
The nearest airport is Madrid–Barajas Airport, located 88 km (55 mi) north east of Toledo.

== Health ==
In the early 1960s, construction of the "Virgen de la Salud" Social Security Health Residence began. The original building still remains in use, although successive extensions were added (maternity, outpatient clinics, operating rooms, etc.) to the existing complex. The complex was also extended to move the clinic to a new nearby building, now converted into the San Ildefonso Specialty Centre.

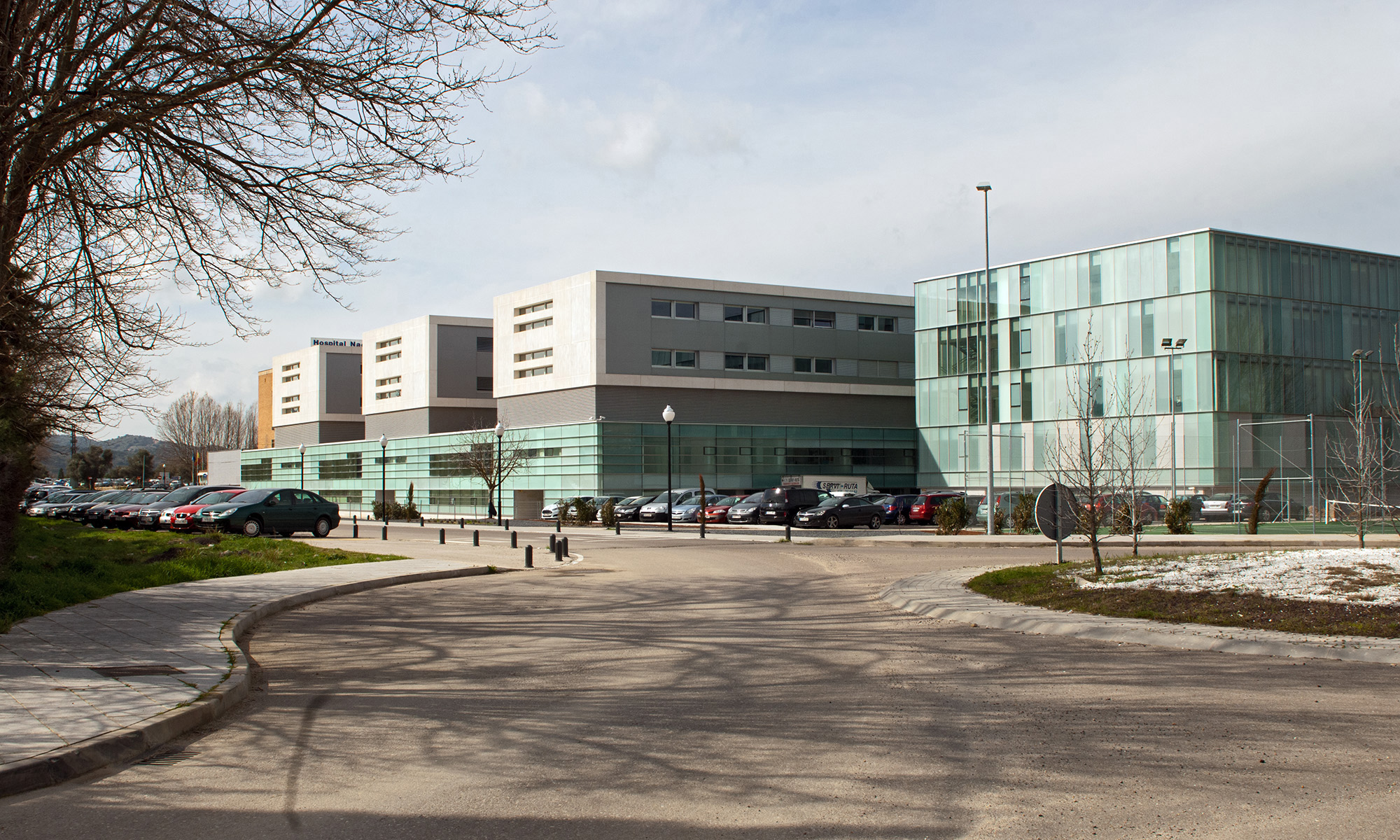
The National Hospital for Paraplegics

The National Hospital for Paraplegics, inaugurated on 7 October 1974, became a national centre for the treatment of spinal cord injuries. It also focuses on the social integration of patients.

The devolution of healthcare responsibilities to the Junta de Comunidades de Castilla–La Mancha gave new impetus to the health infrastructure, demonstrated in 2007 when construction began on the new General Hospital of Toledo in Santa María de Benquerencia. The different parts of the relevant health centres were also provided.

The Toledo Hospital Complex also features the integrated Geriatric Hospital Virgen del Valle, a result of reform and modernization of the old tuberculosis hospital built in the mid-twentieth century. The centre is located outside the city, near the Parador Nacional de Turismo Conde de Orgaz.

The city also has several private health centers, including Hospital de las Tres Culturas and Clínica Nuestra Señora del Rosario.

== Sport ==
Toledo suffered from a shortage of sports facilities. Much of this problem was resolved when the Central School of Physical Education of the Army moved its headquarters to the premises of the Infantry Academy. In the 1990s, the city council took over the old facilities of the military centre, which now include an athletics track, Olympic swimming pool and an indoor sports hall, numerous outdoor courts built in the area of the former runway, having been demolished, and the old gym complex pools (indoor and outdoor).

Besides these facilities, the city of Toledo has sports pavilions in the districts of Santa María de Benquerencia, Santa Bárbara, San Antón (Complejo Deportivo), outdoor pools in Azucaica, Palomarejos, Santa María de Benquerencia, Santa Barbara and Santa Teresa and indoor swimming pools in the gardens of the Alcázar (old town), Santa María de Benquerencia and San Antonio.

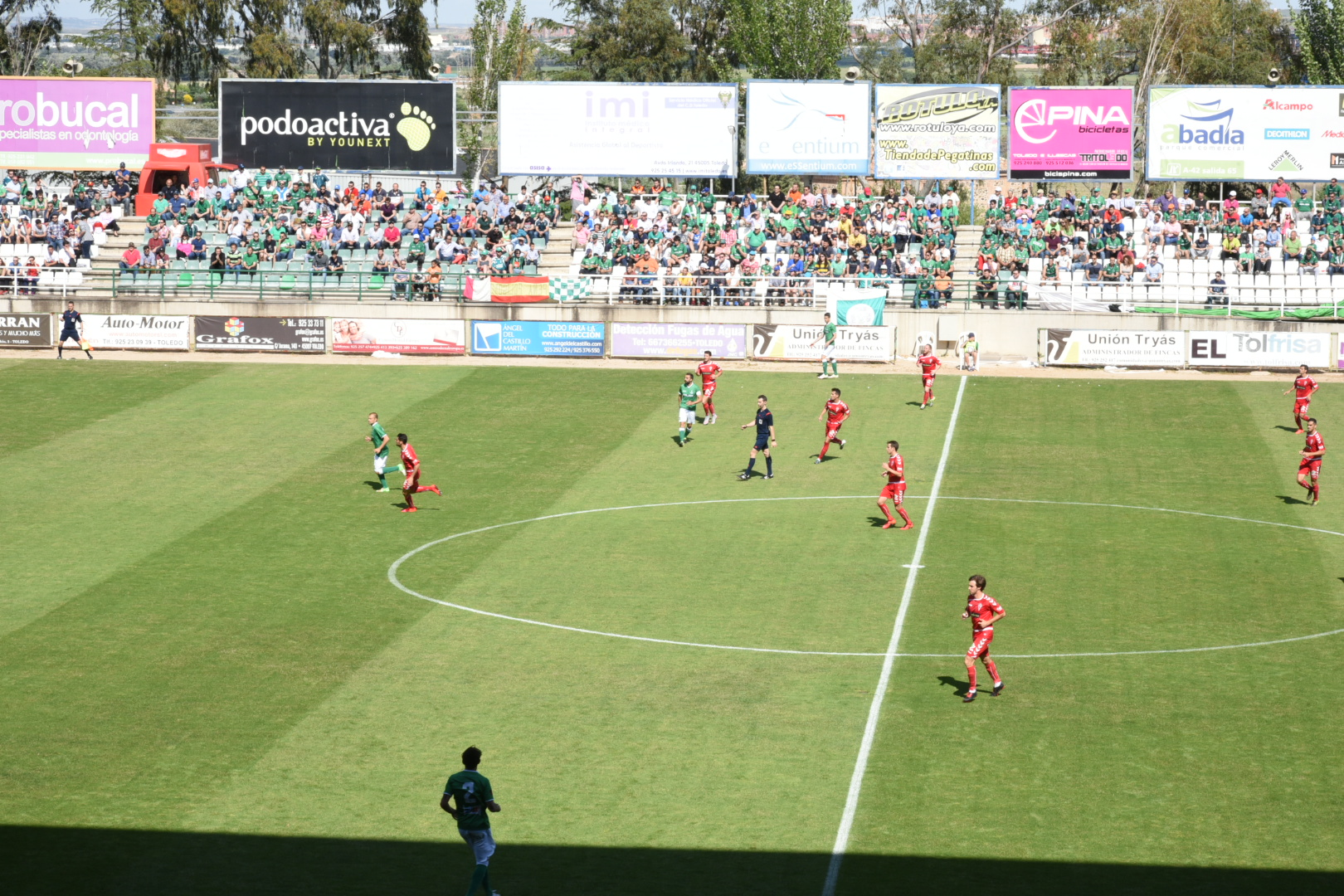
A football fixture between CD Toledo and Real Murcia at the Estadio Salto del Caballo

Toledo has a football team, CD Toledo, founded on 24 April 1928. Their home turf is the Estadio Salto del Caballo, inaugurated on 23 November 1973. The team played for 7 seasons in the Segunda División, during which it reached the play-off final for promotion to La Liga at the end of the 1993–94 season, losing 4–1 on aggregate to Real Valladolid. Toledo players have included Abel Resino, Luis García, former Arsenal coach Unai Emery, Rufete and Casquero. In the 2024–25 season, CD Toledo will play in the Tercera Federación, the fifth tier of Spanish football.

Toledo has two basketball teams: CB CEI Toledo, with a long history of mixed success in both regional and national leagues (EBA) and has just been promoted to 1st Autonomic, and CB Polígono, whose male team was promoted to the EBA League for the 2009/10 season, seven years after relegation. This club is based in the Santa María de Benquerencia district and has one of the largest youth systems in Castilla–La Mancha.

Toledo has been represented in athletics since 2 April 1979 by the Toledo Athletic Club, which is characterised mainly by its success in cross-country, winning a large number of medals in the Spanish championships, in addition to its (male and female) athletes who competed in the 1st division of the national track league in the late 1990s. Among the athletes who have passed through its lanes are Julio Rey, Roberto Parra, Chema Martinez and Julia Lobato.

Since the victory of Federico Bahamontes, 'The Eagle of Toledo', in the 1959 Tour de France, cycling has been one of the most popular sports in the city. At present, however, no school in Santa María de Benquerencia has a velodrome. Other leading professional cyclists from the city include Nemesio Jiménez, who competed at the 1968 Mexico City Olympics, and Ángel de las Heras.

The volleyball club Voleibol Asociación Toledo plays in the National First Division, while the popular Toledo Rugby Club competes in the Madrid league system.

At the individual level, the swimmer Javier Noriega and the marathon runner Julio Rey competed in both 2004 Athens Olympics and 2008 Beijing Olympics. Rey, the current Spanish marathon record holder (2 hours, 6 minutes, and 52 seconds) announced his retirement in October 2009.

== Media ==
Various local and provincial newspapers are published in the city. In addition, national newspapers such as the daily ABC publish unique local editions. Among the local newspapers are the subscription-based La Tribuna de Toledo and El Día de Toledo, as well as the free Global Castilla–La Mancha and Toledo News. The general information weekly magazines Echoes and Here are also published.

There is also local media on television, radio, and the Internet. CMM TV, the regional public television, is headquartered in Toledo. In addition, there are several local television stations: Canal Diocesano-Popular TV and Teletoledo.

As regards radio stations, there is Radio Toledo (Onda Cero), as well as COPE, Cadena SER, RNE, RCM, and Radio Aquí, and the local Onda Polígono and the diocesan station Radio Santa Maria. In digital and social media: Onda Toledo, Toledo Digital, and La Cerca.

== Twin towns – sister cities ==
Toledo is twinned with:

- Aachen, Germany (1984)
- Agen, France (1973)
- Corpus Christi, Texas, United States (1989)
- Damascus, Syria (1994)
- Guanajuato City, Mexico (1978)
- Heraklion, Greece (2014)
- Nara, Japan (1972)
- Old Havana, Cuba (2005)
- Safed, Israel (1981)
- Toledo, Ohio, United States (1931)
- Veliko Tarnovo, Bulgaria (1983)

== See also ==
- Golden age of Jewish culture in Spain
- Councils of Toledo
- Toledo School of Translators
- Palacio de Galiana
- Cerro del Bu
- Artificio de Juanelo
- List of people from Toledo, Spain
