= List of former mosques in Spain =

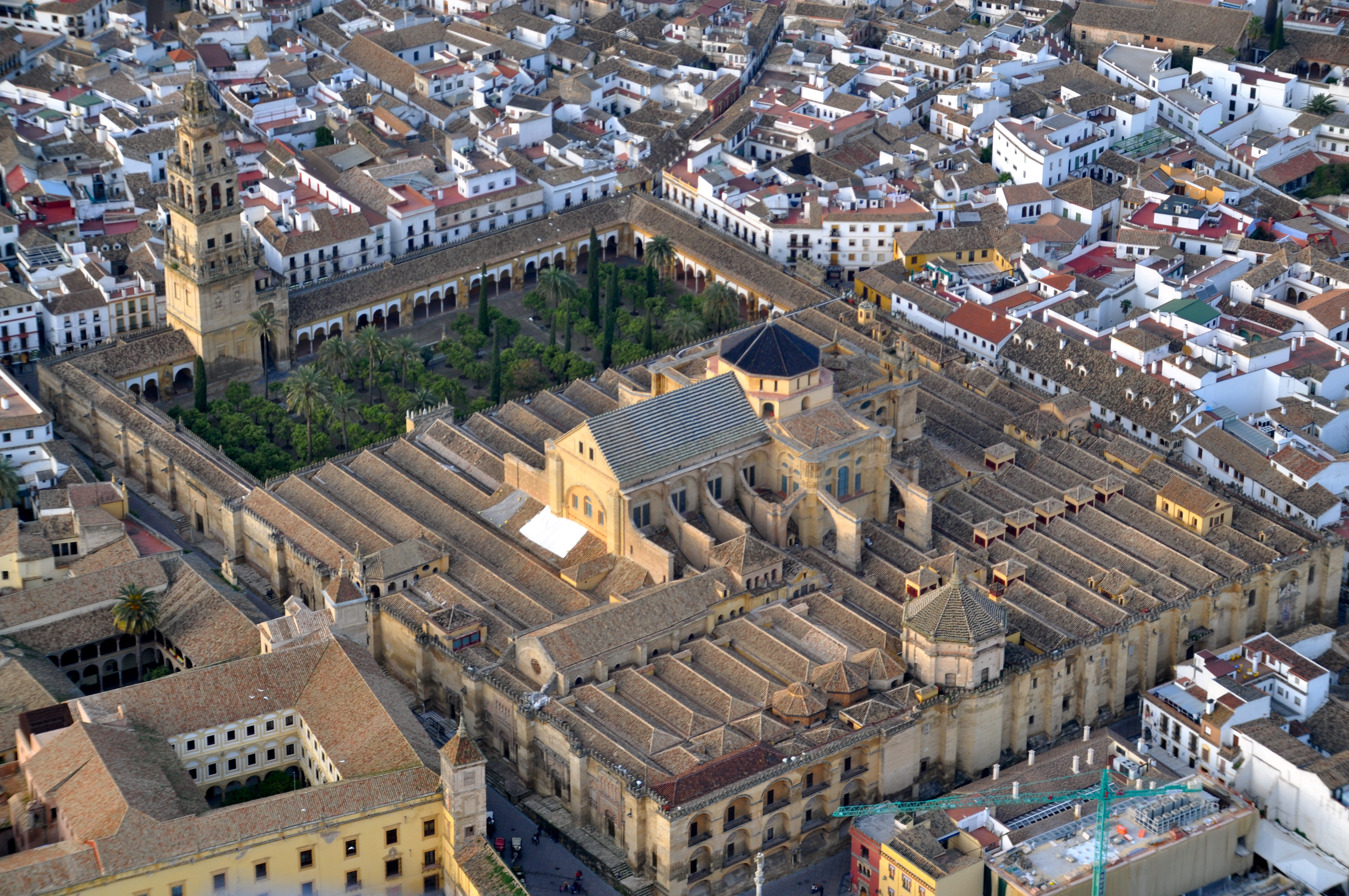
Mosque–Cathedral of Córdoba, one of the best-preserved old structures in Spain.

This is a list of former mosques in Spain. It lists former Muslim mosques (Arabic: Masjid, Spanish: Mezquita) and Islamic places of worship that were located within the modern borders of Spain. Most of these mosques are from the Al-Andalus period. For a list of open, functioning mosques in Spain see list of mosques in Spain.

The term former mosque in this list includes any Muslim mosque (building) or site used for Islamic Prayer (Salah) in Al-Andalus but is not so any longer.

These former mosques were used as Muslim places of worship during the Al-Andalus period from 711 AD to 1492 AD when various Muslim Moorish kingdoms ruled parts of the Iberian Peninsula. Most of these former mosques and religious buildings were either converted into churches or demolished after the Christian reconquest of the Iberian Peninsula (the Reconquista).

== History ==
Mosques were an integral part of Al-Andalus social, political and cultural spheres. With the exception of the remnants of the 10th century Great Mosque of Cordoba, there is very little documentation available in English language about these old historical mosques.

There are only estimates about the number of these mosques. However, there seem to have existed possibly thousands of mosques in Muslim Spain. According to one estimate, there were 3,000 mosques, baths and palaces in Cordoba alone. This was during the 10th century, when Cordoba was one of the largest cities in the world and had over 250,000 buildings spread across an area of twenty four miles long and six miles wide. Today these old mosques in Cordoba are lost without a trace with the exception of the Great Mosque of Cordoba and a few other ruins and remains like the Minaret of San Juan.

At one time there were 137 mosques in the Medina of Grenada when it was the capital city of the Emirate of Granada (1230-1492). During this period the Medina (city) of Granada was one of the largest cities in Europe and welcomed large number of Muslims seeking refuge after being expelled from the Christian controlled areas. This influx doubled its size, and by 1450 made Granada the largest city in Europe in terms of population.

The proliferation of mosques was not limited to large cities. Small cities and towns had multiple mosques built for the easy and quick access of the faithful to perform their daily five times Islamic prayers (Salah) in congregation. There were 18 mosques in Jerez city, of which only the mosque within the fortress of Alcazar of Jerez de la Frontera survives today. There were 16 mosques in Vélez-Málaga (then known as Ballis Medina) during the Nazari Granada Emirate period. Ronda a smaller town had 7 or 8 mosques of which today only a minaret tower of a medium-size mosque remains. About 5 former mosques still exist in Toledo with the original structures at least partially preserved, as shown in the list below.

== Al-Andalus ==
=== Building or ruins remains ===
This table lists former mosques in Al-Andalus with identified original buildings or ruins of the former mosque still existing on the premises.

Note: Mesquita means mosque in the Spanish language.

Current name	Mosque Name	Images	City	Province	Year opened	Year closed	Notes	Ref.
Mosque–Cathedral of Córdoba	Great Mosque of Córdoba (Qurṭuba), Aljama Mosque		Córdoba	Andalusia	early 8th century	1236	After the Muslim conquest of the Visigothic Kingdom (710~), the site of former main Visigothic church of Cordoba was divided and shared between Muslims and Christians for seven decades. Later Abd al-Rahman I purchased Christian part and built the great mosque in 785. Major extensions were added in 9th and 10th centuries, until final extension in the 10th century under Almanzor. After Christians captured Cordoba in 1236, King Ferdinand III of Castile converted the mosque into a cathedral. Later, a cathedral was built at the center of the old mosque, configuring the current Mosque-Cathedral of Cordoba. It was the second largest mosque in the world after Mecca Great mosque from around the 9th century, until Sultan Ahmed Mosque, Istanbul was built in 1588. It had a surface area of 23,400 square metres (2.34 ha) and accommodated an estimated 32,000 to 40,000 worshipers. Current mosque structure date from 784 to 987.	
Mosque of Cristo de la Luz	Mezquita Bab-al-Mardum		Toledo	Castilla–La Mancha	999	1186	Converted into a church. One of the best preserved Moorish mosques in Spain.	
Giralda	Great Mosque of Seville		Seville	Andalusia	1248	Only minaret remains. Mosque comparable in size to Great mosque of Cordoba, destroyed by earthquake in 1365. Minaret used as a church bell tower was built higher in the 16th century.		
Mosque of Cuatrovitas	Bollullos de la Mitación		Seville	Andalusia	1180	15th century	The Hermitage of Our Lady of Cuatrovitas was originally an Almohad mosque. Despite the modifications, the original structure can still be reproduced. The tower is in fact the minaret.	
Almonaster la Real Mosque			Almonaster la Real	Andalusia	10th century		Built on site of the 5th-century Visigoth basilica. Converted into a church after Reconquista. National Monument since 1931.	
Mezquita del Alcázar de Jerez la Frontera			Jerez de la Frontera (Jerez)	Andalusia	11th century	mid 13th century	Located within former Moorish fortress of Alcazar of Jerez de la Frontera. Only surviving mosque building of 18 former mosques in the Jerez city. Converted into church after Reconquista.	
Mosque of las Tornerías	Al-Mustimim		Toledo	Castilla–La Mancha	1060		Unusual two-storied mosque. Was built in a busy commercial neighborhood (Arrabal de Francos). Used as a church until 1498–1505, and other uses since. Restoration and preservation done recently.	
Mezquita de Tórtoles			Tarazona	Aragon		15th century	Mosque remains almost not altered in the later centuries. Current building was built in 2 stages, one early 15th century, other late 15th century. It is attached to the remains of the old fortified tower of town castle. Converted into a church in 1526.	
Aljama Mosque of Medina Azahara	Aljama Masjid of Madinat al-Zahra		Córdoba	Andalusia	940	1010	A mosque in Madinat al-Zahra, a vast, fortified Moorish palace-city built by Abd-ar-Rahman III (912–961). The marbled, jeweled complex was plundered & destroyed first by Muslims, then by Christians when civil war ended Caliphate of Córdoba. A UNESCO World Heritage site since 2018.	
San Sebastián de Toledo	Al-Dabbagin Masjid		Toledo	Castilla–La Mancha		1085~	Converted into a church after 1085 Christian conquest of area. Renovated several times but original interior structure remains. Building now used as a concert and exhibition hall. Bell tower built in the 15th century shows characteristics of a former minaret. Ruins of Arab Baths of Tenerías remain lower below on slope. A short reference to mosque exist by Ibn Baskuwal (1101–83) reported by Fath ibn Ibrahim.	
Small Royal mosque inside Aljafería Palace			Zaragoza	Aragon	10th century		Located inside the great fortified palace. A small octagonal mosque, designed as a private oratory for the king and his family. Mosque architecture inspired by Córdoba mosque. Aljafería is a UNESCO World Heritage site since 1986.	
Iglesia de El Salvador, Toledo			Toledo	Castilla–La Mancha	9th century	1085	Mosque built on former Visigoth or Roman substrate. Now a rebuilt church but excavations revealed 9th century structures & elements of mosque - horseshoe arch arcade, primitive stone minaret, flooring, courtyard with cistern.	
Alminar de Árchez, Alminar Mudéjar (Mudejar Minaret of Árchez)	Masjid al-Ta`ibin, Mezquita de los Conversos (Mosque of convert)		Árchez	Andalusia		14th century	Only 15-meter-tall (49 ft) minaret remains, used as belfry of Árchez church built on mosque location. Minaret is an Almohade architecture monument and only remaining jewel of Nazarí period.	
San Sebastian Minaret (Alminar De San Sebastian)			Ronda	Andalusia		1485	Only minaret of the medium-size mosque in Plaza Abul Beka neighborhood remains. Minaret was expanded and used as a bell tower. The mosque was converted to a church but destroyed in 1600s during Morisco Revolts. Ronda was a Muslim city for 700 years. The city had 7 or 8 mosques, none survive today.	
Alminar de San Juan (Minaret of San Juan)			Córdoba	Andalusia	930		Only minaret remains of mosque built in 930 during 1st Spanish Umayyad caliph 'Abd al-Rahman III. Now its belfry of San Juan church.	
Iglesia de Santiago del Arrabal, Toledo			Toledo	Castilla–La Mancha			Converted to church in 1223–25. Caliphate era minaret survives. Church is a Mudéjar style masterpiece, built in 1245–47 on prior structures of a mosque and Visigoth building.	
Church of Nuestra Señora de la Encarnación (Benaque, Macharaviaya)			Macharaviaya	Andalusia			One of few preserved mosques with original minaret and solid block building built of brick & masonry. Interior single rectangular prayer hall now a church nave. Drilling Mecca facing wall in 2003 showed original mosque construction and 19th century work. Reconquista era document says "...While it was the visitation and reformation of the houses in the alcayua (or alamiya) in Benaque, the inhabitants used mosque as a parish church, where they had images and heard Mass..." .	

=== Original buildings destroyed ===
This table lists former mosques in Al-Andalus with no known surviving mosque buildings. The original mosques were completely destroyed by people, war or by natural causes like earthquakes. Other structures were built on the site destroying or covering traces of the mosque. The ruins and stone materials of the mosque were often reused to build the new structures. However these sites may still contain undiscovered original structures within the current buildings or un-excavated ruins on the premises.

Current name	Mosque Name	Location image	Location	Year opened	Year closed	Notes	Ref.
Cathedral of the Savior of Zaragoza	Aljama de Saraqusta, Mezquita Mayor de Zaragoz (Great Mosque of Zaragoza)		Zaragoza	714-716	1119	One of the largest & oldest mosques in Al-Andalus. Enlarged later to 54 × 86 meters. Looked like Cordoba great mosque. First built by Hanas ben Abdallah as San’ani, a disciple of prophet Muhammad according to al-Humauydí. Converted to Cathedral despite another Cathedral very near used by Christians during Moorish rule. Minaret lasted till 17th century. Restoration in 1999, revealed mosque size, entrance location etc.	
Iglesia Colegial del Divino Salvador	Mosque of Ibn Abbas		Seville	830 or earlier	1340	The original "Great Mosque" of Seville, before the 12th century mosque built by the Almohads (which in turn is now occupied by the Cathedral). It was also known as the Mosque of Ibn Abbas. It was either built or expanded by Abd ar-Rahman II in 830, as recorded in an inscription that has been preserved in one of the city's museums. The mosque had a very similar format to the early Great Mosque of Cordoba: a courtyard to the north and a prayer hall to the south divided into 11 naves by rows of arches, with the central nave in front of the mihrab being slightly wider. The minaret was located on the north side of the courtyard and had a square base measuring 5.88 metres per side. After the Christian conquest of Seville, the mosque continued to be reserved for Muslims for a time, until 1340 when it was converted to a church. The original building deteriorated over time until in 1674 it was demolished and construction of a new Baroque church was begun. The present-day church preserves only minor traces of the mosque.	
Church of San Nicolás, Madrid	Aljama mosque of Mayrit		Madrid			Current oldest church in Madrid dating back to 1202. It was built over a mosque of what was then called Mayrit. Archaeologists believe that the 12th century bell tower was originally a minaret. Tower in Moorish Arabic Mudéjar architecture. The Muslims lost Madrid in 1085.	
Granada Cathedral	Nasrid Great Mosque of Granada		Granada			Emirate of Granada, last Muslim kingdom in the Iberian Peninsula fell in 1492. Granada Cathedral began in 1505 on the site of the city's main mosque. Royal Chapel of Granada is built over the former terrace of the Great Mosque.	
Basílica de Santa María de la Asunción			Arcos de la Frontera			Church was built in 15th-16th century on the remains of a Moorish mosque. Site dates back to 8th-9th century.	
Baza Cathedral			Baza			Cathedral was built on the site of an old mosque in the 16th century. Baza was under Moorish rule from 713 to 1489 AD with a population of 50,000.	
Guadix Cathedral	Al-Hama mosque		Guadix			Principle mosque of Guadix when Muslims ruled it from 711 to 1489. Mosque built over a Visigoth temple. Cathedral began construction over mosque in 1710.	
Church of Santa Catalina, Valencia			Valencia		13th century	Converted into church shortly after the reconquista in the 13th century. Church was rebuilt several times since.	
Valencia Cathedral			Valencia			Originally a Roman temple, it was turned into a Visigothic cathedral, then into a mosque under Moors. Converted into a cathedral in 1238 after the Reconquista and rebuilt later.	
Iglesia de San Román, Toledo, (Museum of the Councils of Toledo)			Toledo			13th century Mudéjar style rebuilt church. Contains traces of a Caliphate mosque, primitive Visigoth Church pillars and possible prior Roman building. Groups of three, toral arches like in a caliphate mosque prayer hall and two parts in Mudejar bell tower indicate a previous Islamic minaret base.	
Old Cathedral of Lleida			Lleida	882	1149	In 882 on this hill, Moors reordered defenses over a previous Visigoth structure and built the Zuda along with a mosque. Following the Reconquista, the mosque was converted into a Cathedral. 2 fornículas rescued from old city mosque place on a cathedral door.	
Church of Our Lady of the Assumption (Alfacar)	Mimbar de Alfacar		Alfacar		1500	Arab mosque consecrated after revolt in 1500 and a primitive church built on its foundations. Current church built in Mudejar style in 1557. At the decline of the Muslim era, the town consisted of 980 people and 245 houses.	
Church of Santa Maria de Tarifa			Tarifa			Church was built end of 13th-century over mosque remains. Four columns and part of the coffered ceiling of the mosque are preserved.	
Iglesia de San Mateo (Tarifa)			Tarifa			Old mosque within premises of town's Alcazar fortification. Current church built in 1506 on remains of a mosque.	

== See also ==
- List of Moorish structures in Spain and Portugal
- Islam in Spain
- Umayyad conquest of Hispania
- Reconquista
- List of mosques in Spain
- List of former mosques in Portugal
- List of the oldest mosques in the world
