= List of Moorish structures in Spain and Portugal =

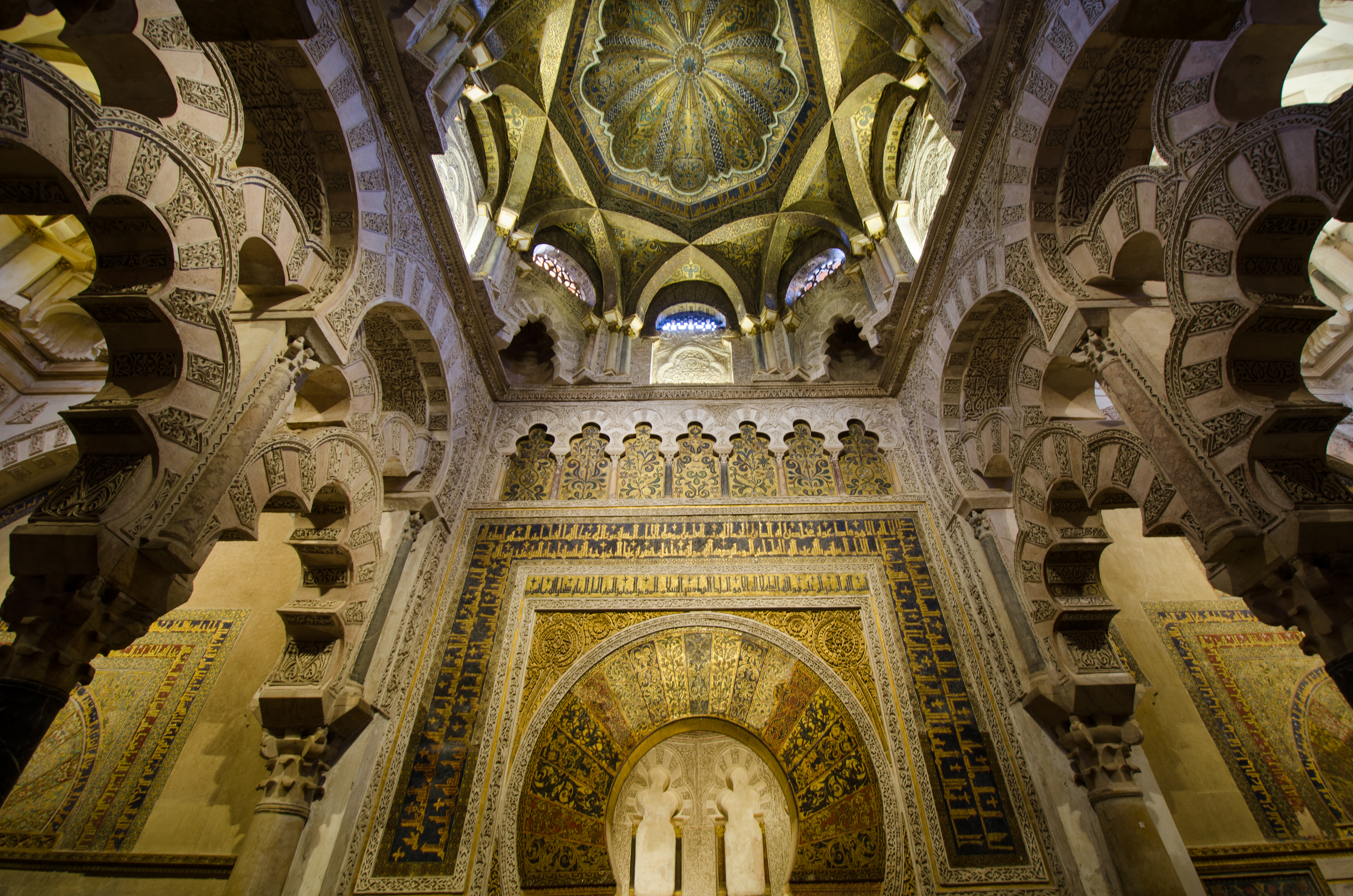
The mihrab area of the Great Mosque of Córdoba (8th–10th centuries)

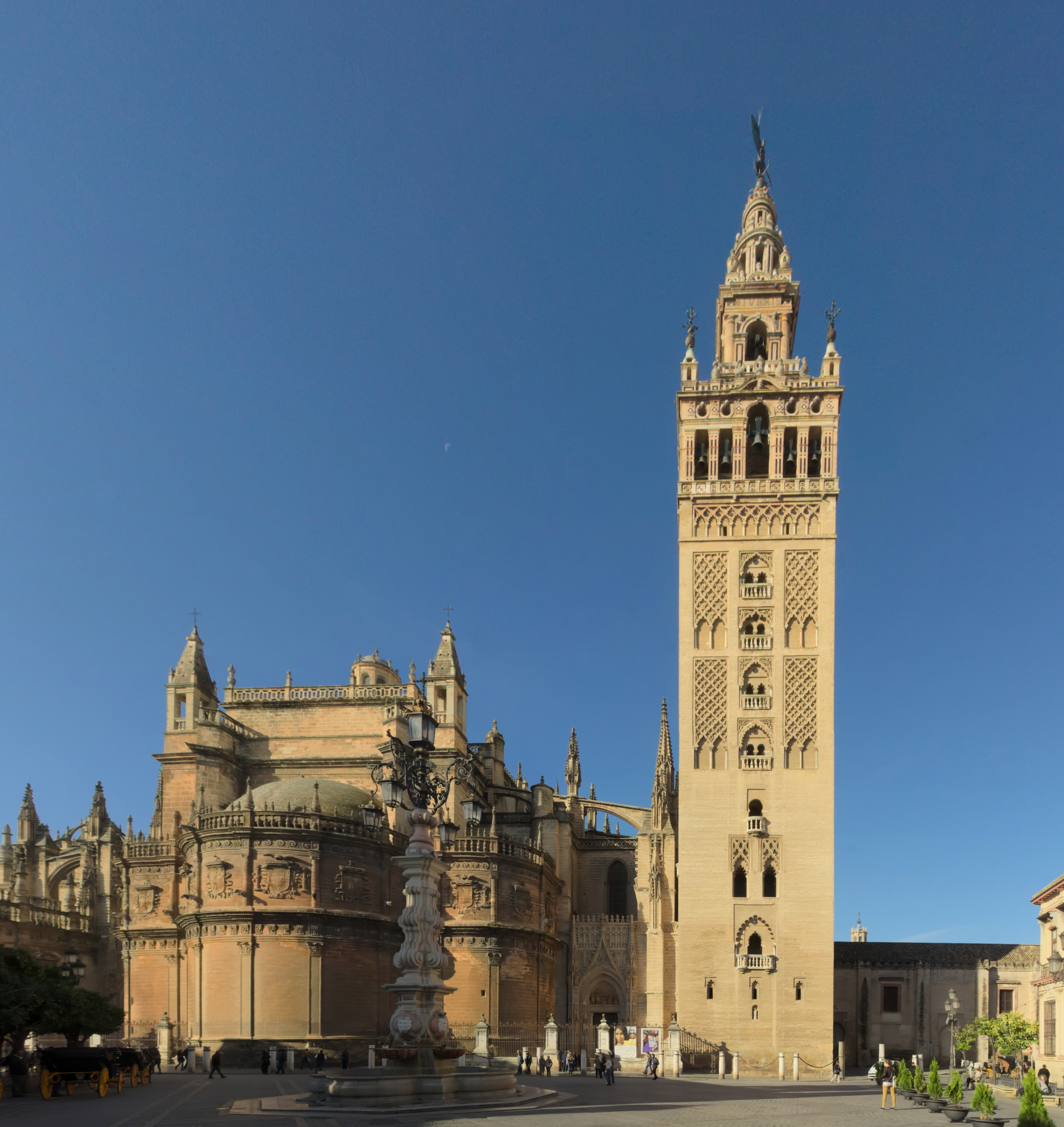
The Giralda tower (right), a former minaret (12th century), now part of the Seville Cathedral

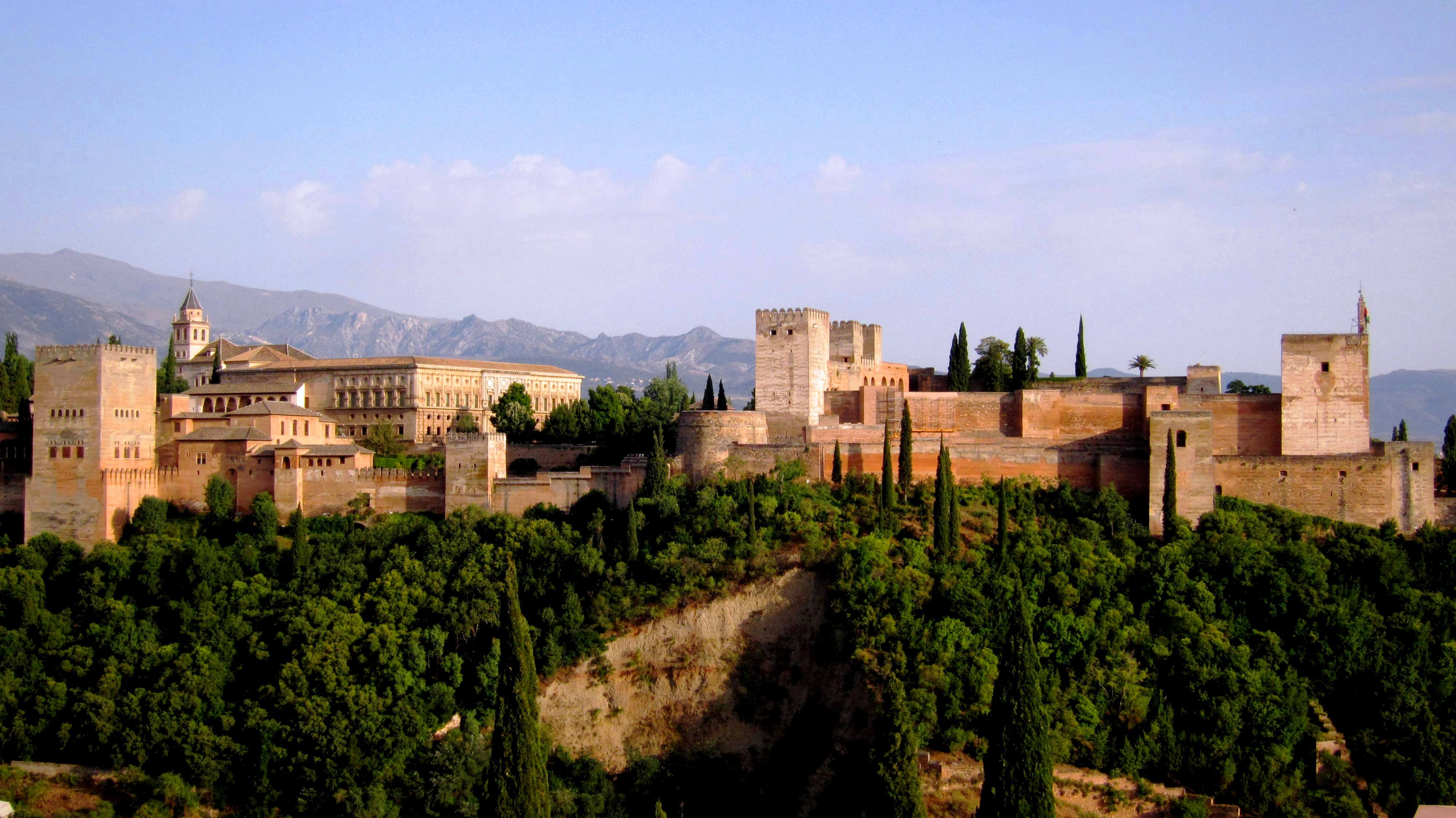
The Alhambra complex in Granada, dating from the Nasrid period (13th–15th centuries), with later Christian Renaissance additions

This is a list of preserved or partly-preserved Moorish architecture in Spain and Portugal from the period of Muslim rule on the Iberian Peninsula (known as al-Andalus) from the 8th to 15th centuries. The list is organized by geographic location.

== Spain ==
Alhama de Granada

- Arab baths of Alhama de Granada

Alicante

- Santa Bárbara Castle

Almería

- Alcazaba
- Church of San Juan: former site of the city's Great Mosque, with an Almohad-era mihrab still preserved

Antequera

- Alcazaba

Árchez

- Church of Nuestra Señora de la Encarnación: Nasrid minaret at the Mudéjar-style

Badajoz

- Alcazaba

Baños de la Encina

- Burgalimar Castle: Umayyad-era castle built in 967

Córdoba

- Mosque–Cathedral of Córdoba
- Madinat al-Zahra
- Caliphal Baths
- Calahorra Tower
- Noria of Albolafia
- Synagogue
- Church of San Juan de los Caballeros: the bell tower, also known as the "Minaret of San Juan", once belonged to a mosque (930)

Gibraltar

- Moorish Castle

Gormaz

- Castle of Gormaz: 10th-century castle, with later modifications

Granada

- Alhambra
  - Alcazaba: the main fortress of the Alhambra
  - Mexuar: one of the palaces partially preserved today
  - Comares Palace: one of the palaces preserved today
  - Palace of the Lions: one of the palaces preserved today
  - Partal Palace: one of the palaces preserved today
  - Palacio del Partal Alto: a former palace whose excavated remains are visible today
  - Palace of the Convent of San Francisco: a former palace whose remains were incorporated into a later Christian convent
  - Palace of the Abencerrajes: a former palace whose excavated remains are visible today
  - Torre de la Cautiva: one of several similar tower-residences, with other examples including the Torre de las Infantas and the Peinador de la Reina
- Generalife: a country palace, originally linked to the Alhambra by a covered walkway across the ravine that divides them
- Madrasa of Granada: prayer hall preserved inside a later Spanish Baroque building
- Corral del Carbón: a funduq (caravanserai)
- Alcaicería of Granada: Nasrid-era bazaar, but destroyed by fire in 19th century and rebuilt in different style
- Albaicín quarter
  - El Bañuelo (Arab Baths)
  - Dar al-Horra
  - City walls and gates (remains from Zirid and Nasrid periods)
  - Church of San José: Zirid-era minaret (ca. 1055)
  - Church of San Juan de los Reyes: Almohad-era minaret
  - Casa de Zafra
  - Church of San Salvador: remains of the courtyard and minaret of the former congregational mosque of the Albaicín
  - Maristan of Granada
- Cuarto Real de Santo Domingo: partly-preserved Nasrid palace
- Alcázar Genil: former Almohad and Nasrid-era residence, as well as a nearby ribat (rábita) converted into the Hermitage of San Sebastián

Fiñana

- Ermita de Nuestro Padre Jesús: former Almohad mosque with remains of mihrab and surface decoration

Jaén

- Arab Baths of Jaén
- Castle of Santa Catalina

Jerez de la Frontera

- Alcazar

Málaga

- Alcazaba
- Gibralfaro Castle
- Bobastro (located in Málaga Province), archaeological site and former 9th-century fortress

Mérida

- Alcazaba

Murcia

- Castillejo de Monteagudo
- Monastery of Santa Clara: remains of 12th-century al-Qasr al-Seghir (Alcázar Seguir)
- Museum of the Church of San Juan de Dios: remains of mihrab of the former mosque of the main citadel (Alcázar Mayor)

Niebla

- City walls and gates

Ronda

- Arab baths of Ronda
- Remains of mihrab of former main mosque at the Cathedral of Ronda

Seville

- Giralda: former minaret of the Almohad Great Mosque of Seville (now the Seville Cathedral)
- Torre del Oro: Almohad defensive tower in Seville
- Alcazar of Seville: mostly rebuilt under Christian rule but in Moorish style, with the help of craftsmen from Granada
- Walls of Seville
- Buhaira Gardens: former Almohad palace and garden
- Church of San Salvador: preserves traces of the former Mosque of Ibn Adabbas on this site, the first city's first great mosque

Tarifa

- Castle of Tarifa

Toledo

- Mosque of Cristo de la Luz
- Puerta de Bisagra
- Puerta de Alcántara
- Mosque of las Tornerías
- Church of San Román (Mudéjar architecture)
- Synagogue of Santa Maria la Blanca (Mudéjar architecture)
- Synagogue del Tránsito (Mudéjar architecture)

Trujillo

- Alcazaba

Zaragoza

- Aljafería: palace of the Banu Hud dynasty (second half of the 11th century)

== Portugal ==
Albufeira

- Castle of Paderne

Lisbon

- Castle of São Jorge: almost entirely rebuilt after the Portuguese conquest; only some archeological remains and a small part of the northern wall are preserved from the Islamic period

Mértola

- Church of Nossa Senhora da Anunciação: former mosque

Silves

- Castle of Silves

Sintra

- Castle of the Moors

Loulé

- Islamic baths: remains now on display in the municipal museum (Museu Municipal de Loulé), probably dating to the mid-12th century.

== See also ==
- Alcazar of the Caliphs in Córdoba (no longer extant)
- List of former mosques in Spain
- List of former mosques in Portugal
