= Puerta Bab al-Mardum =

City-gate in Toledo, Spain

Coordinates: 39.8609°N 4.0244°W

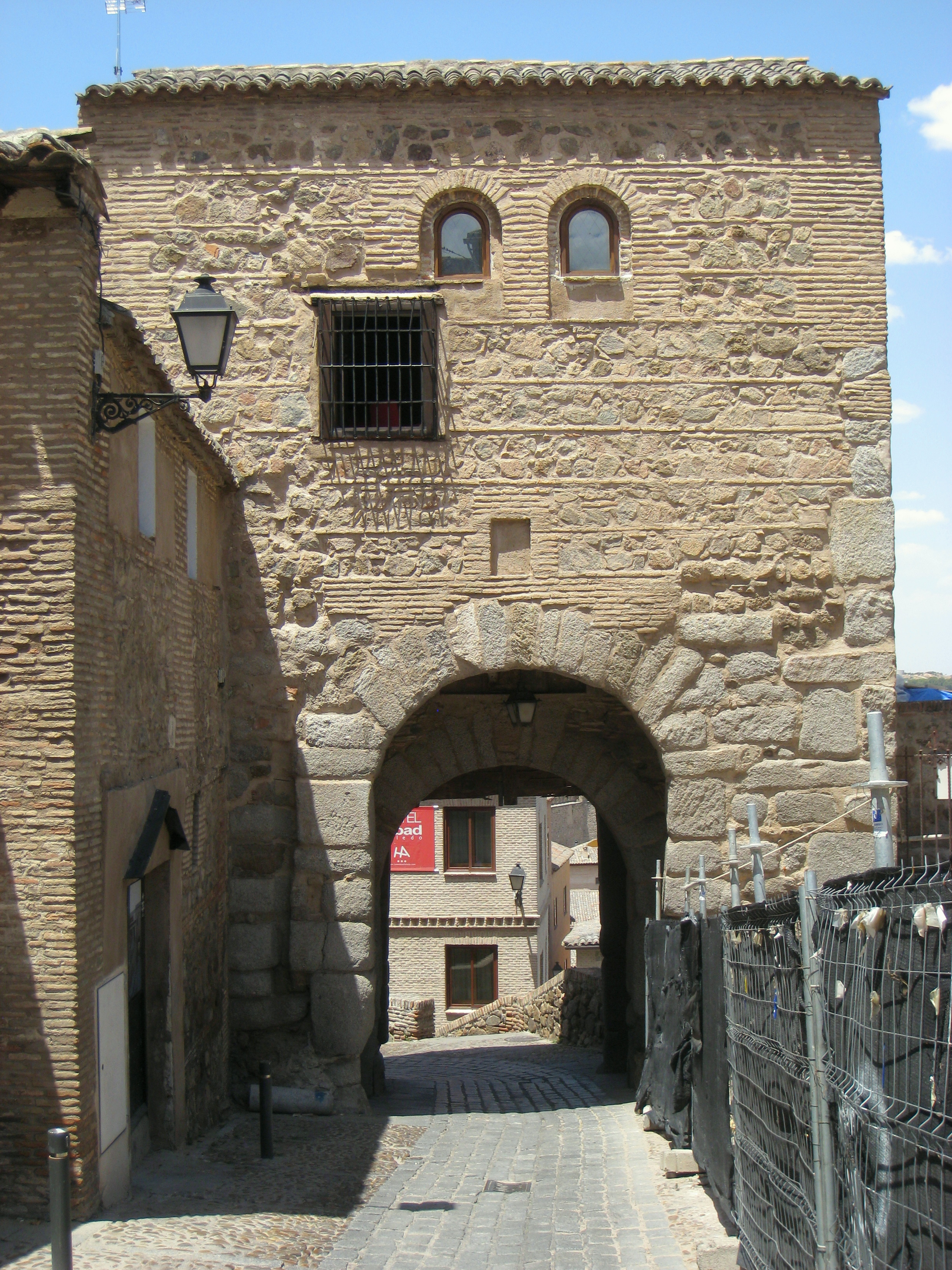
Puerta Bab al-Mardum (Puerta de Valmardón).

The Puerta Bab al-Mardum, or Puerta de Valmardón, is a city-gate of Toledo, Spain. It was built in the 10th century and is one of the oldest gates in the city. Its name 'mardum' is Arabic for 'blocked up'. Perhaps because its function was taken over by the Puerta del Sol. The Spanish name Valmardón is a rough, phonetic imitation of the Arabic. 'Mezquita Bab al-Mardum' is another name for the nearby Mosque of Cristo de la Luz.
