= Baños de Tenerías =

Cultural property in Toledo, Spain

Coordinates: 39.8529°N 4.0261°W

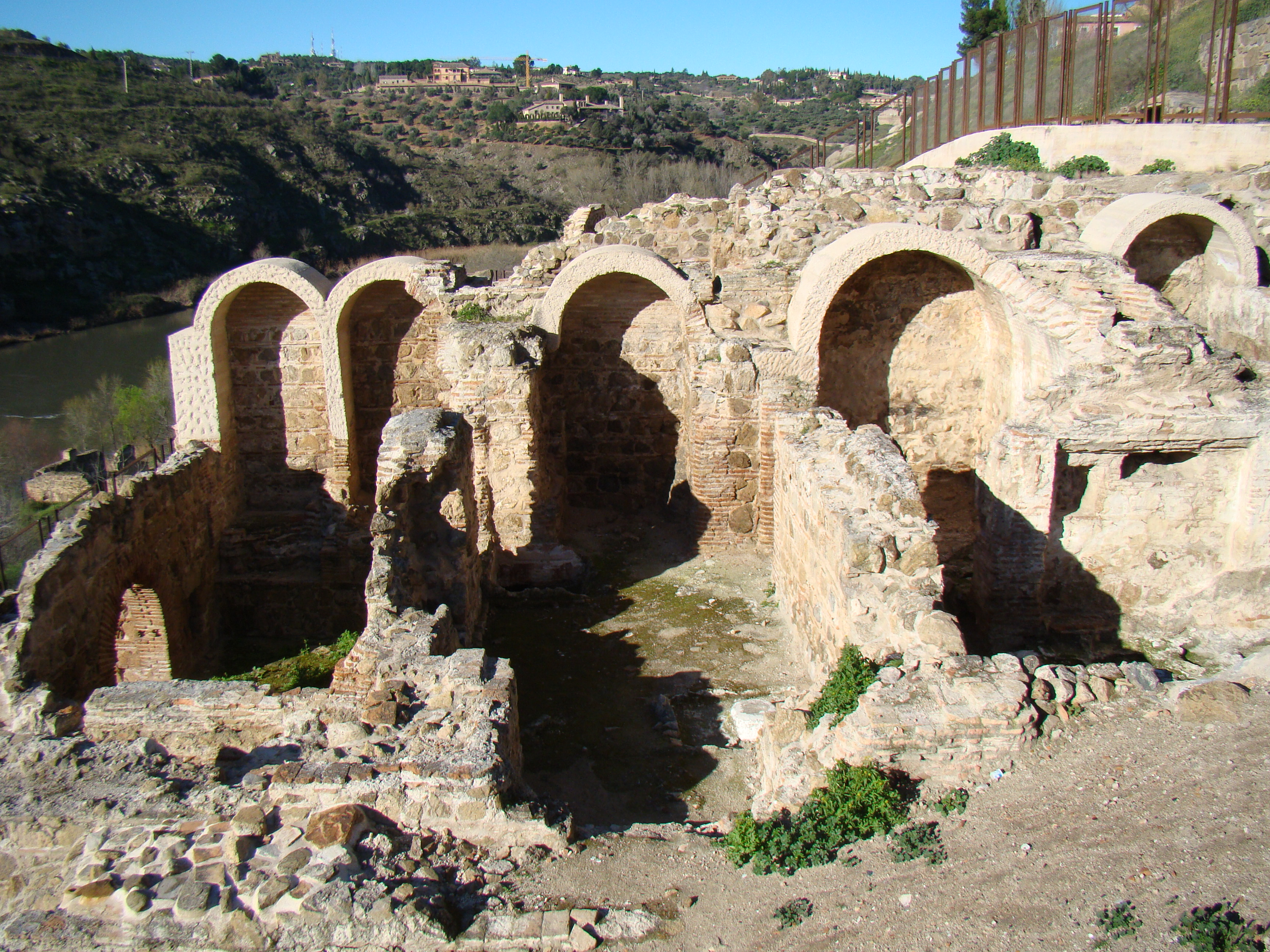
Baños de Tenerías

The Baños de Tenerías were a public bath in Toledo, Castile-La Mancha. The structure has been dated to the beginning of the 11th century, when Toledo was under Islamic rule, and formed one of the six Arab baths in the city.

The Spanish name Tenerías refers to the baths being located in the leather-working district of the city. The baths would have offered the possibility of washing before prayers at the nearby Al-Dabbagin Mosque (which later became the Church of San Sebastián).

It is divided into the living room "bayt al-mash", the latrines, the cold room "bayt al-bárid", the temperate room "bayt al-wastani", the hot room "bayt al-sajûn", the cistern and the qanat.

== See also ==
- Bathroom
- Public toilet
