= Church of San Sebastián, Toledo =

San Sebastián
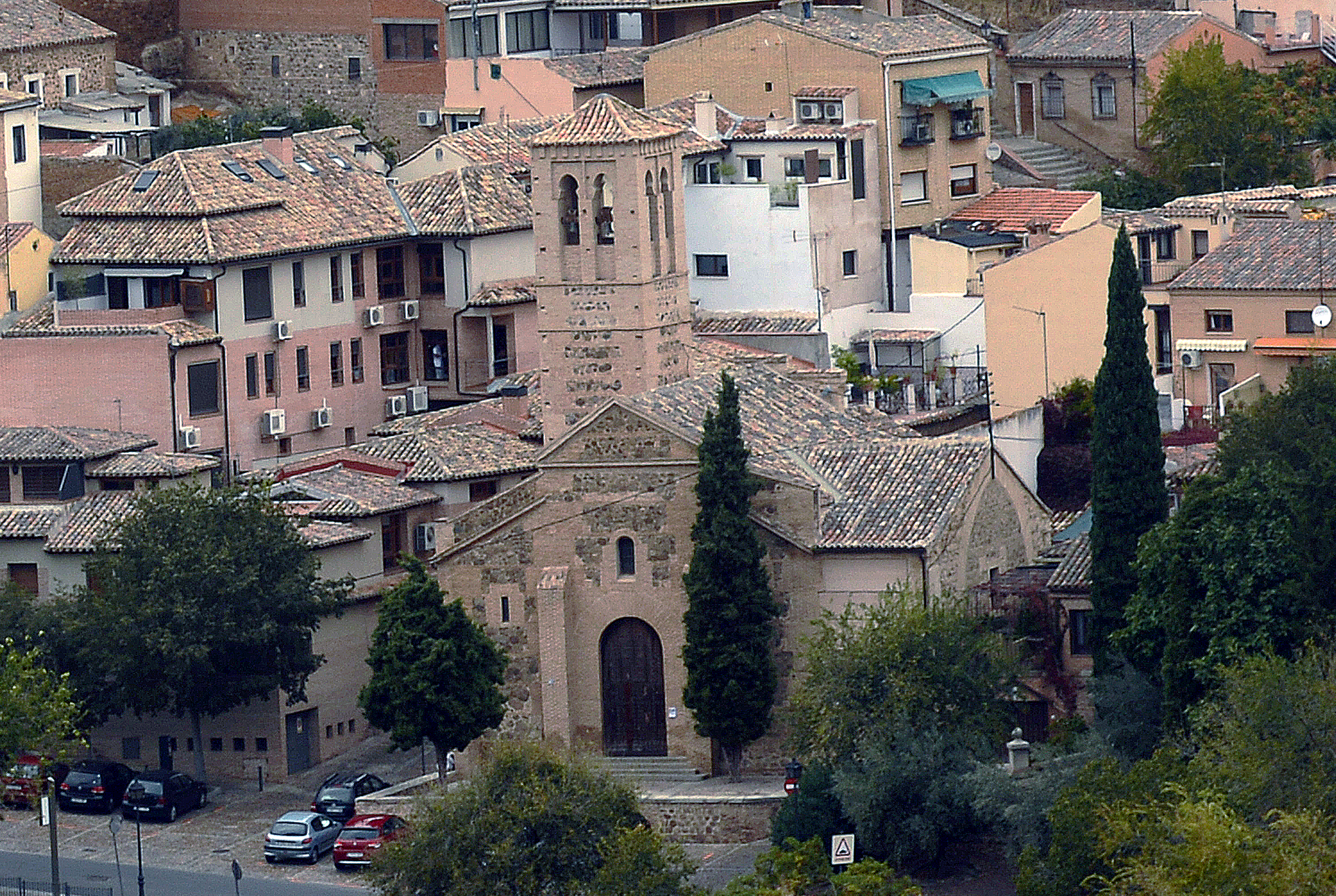
- San Sebastián
- 39.8535°N 4.0255°W
- Location: Toledo
- Country: Spain
- Website: consorciotoledo.org/patrimonio/iglesia-san-sebastian/

History
- Former name: AL-Dabbagin mosque
- Founded: 10th century
- Dedication: St Sebastian

Architecture
- Architectural type: Mudejar
- Completed: 15th century

San Sebastian is a redundant church in Toledo, Spain. Originally a mosque, it was converted for use as church after the Reconquista. It is protected by the heritage listing Bien de Interés Cultural.

== History ==
Archeological research shows that the building was constructed in the 10th century and enlarged in the 11th century, as a mosque called Al-Dabbagin (sometimes transliterated as Adabaquín). It was close to the former city gate of Bab-al-Dabbagin (also known by its Spanish name, Puerta de los Curtidores ["Gate of the Tanners"] ) and to the baths now known as Baños de Tenerías.

Some time after Toledo was reconquered in 1085, the building became a church, belonging to one of six parishes where Alfonso VI of León and Castile permitted the use of the Mozarabic rite. Its architectural reconstruction dates from the late 12th or the 13th century.

== Architecture ==
The church as it now remains shows the characteristics of the Mudéjar architectural style, with rich Arabic decorations. The tower of the church shows characteristics of the former minaret that stood in its place and is from the 15th century.

== Concert Hall and Museum ==
Since 1916 in the hands of the Consorcio de Toledo, the building is used as a Concert Hall and center for expositions of contemporary artists. 2017 the Spanish artist Lita Mora showed her installation about Dante's Inferno and 2018 the Consorcio of Toledo organized the exhibition of Swiss artist Daniel Garbade: "In Bed with Greco and Picasso".

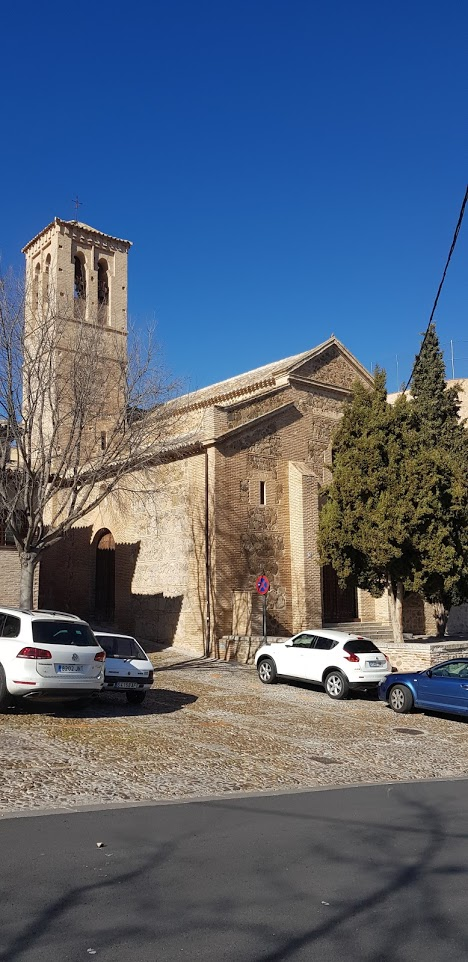

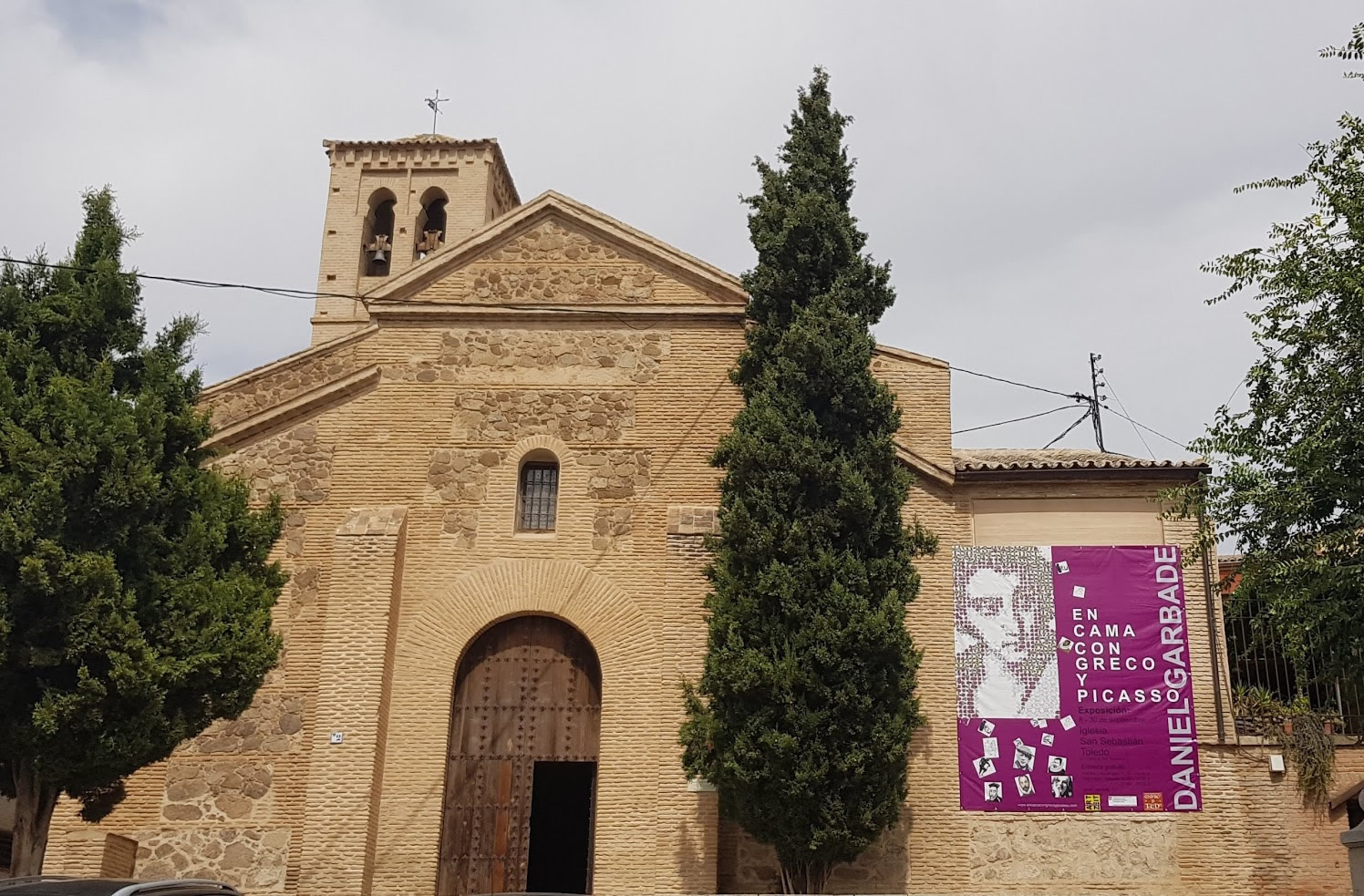
Entrance of the church

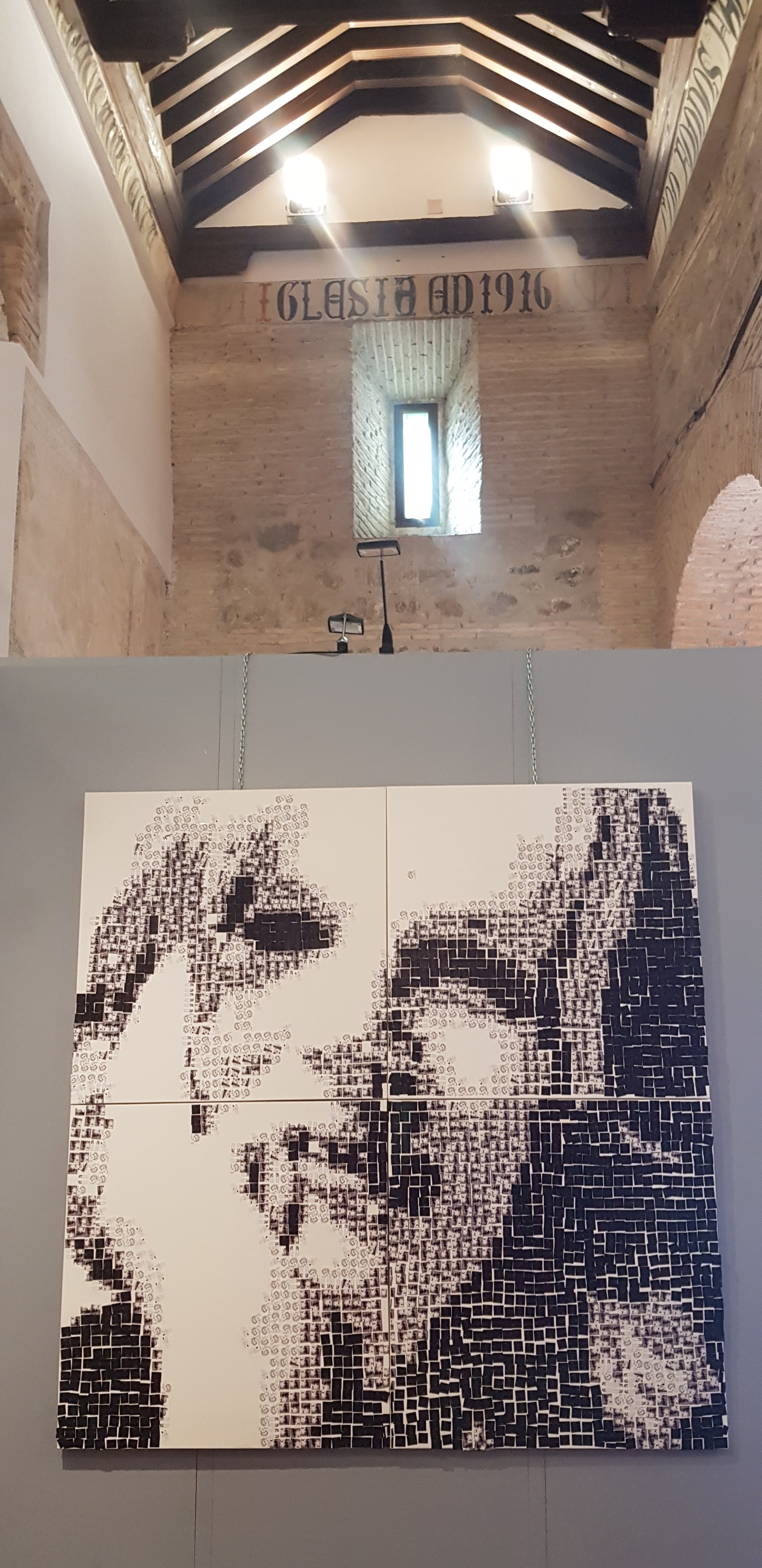
Exhibitions in the Church of San Sebastian,

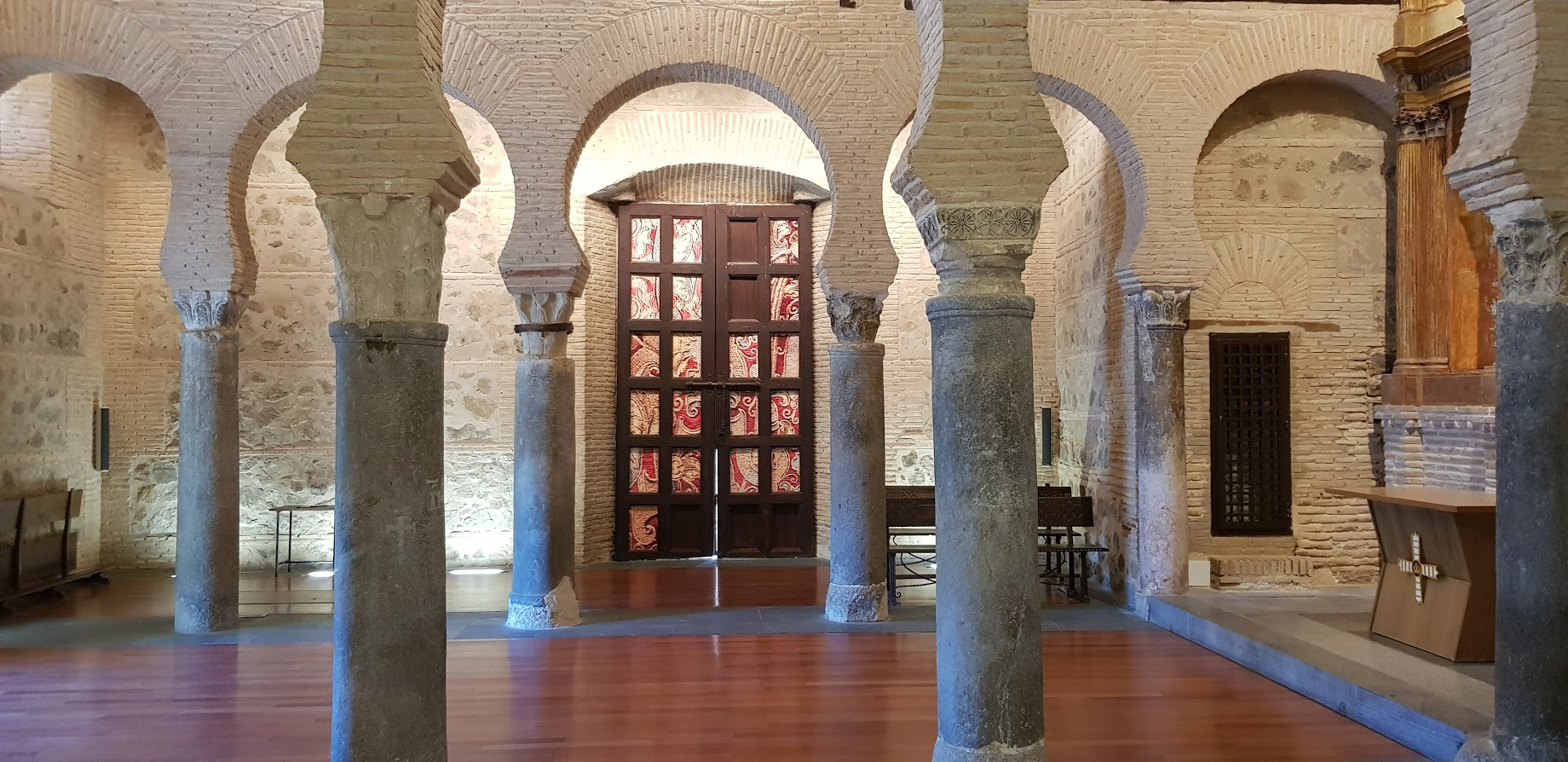
Interior

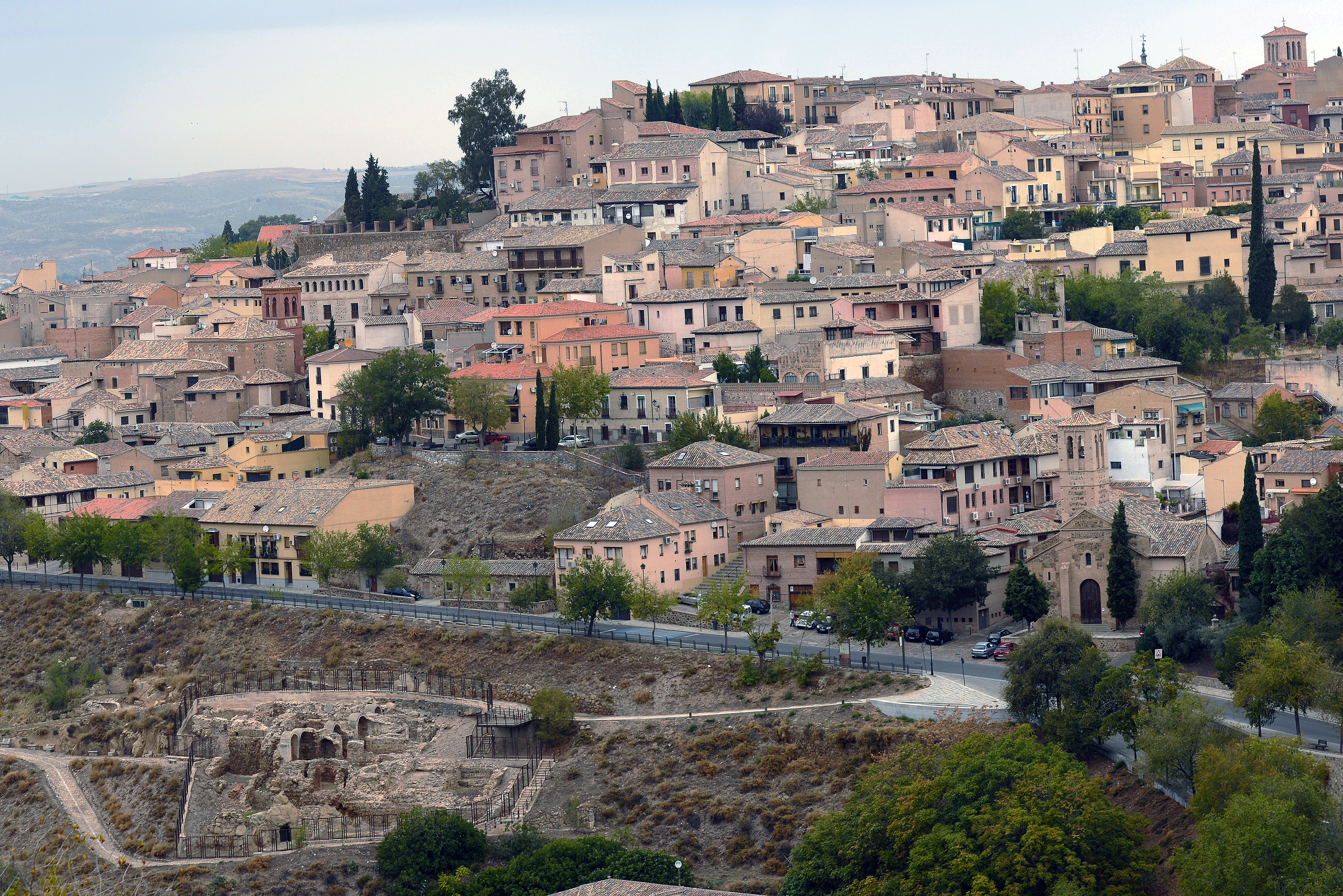
Ubication of the church in Toledo

== See also ==
- Mezquita de las Tornerias
- Mosque of Cristo de la Luz
