= Iglesia de San Mateo (Tarifa) =

History of Capilla Del Sagrario

Coordinates: 36°0′48″N 5°36′7″W

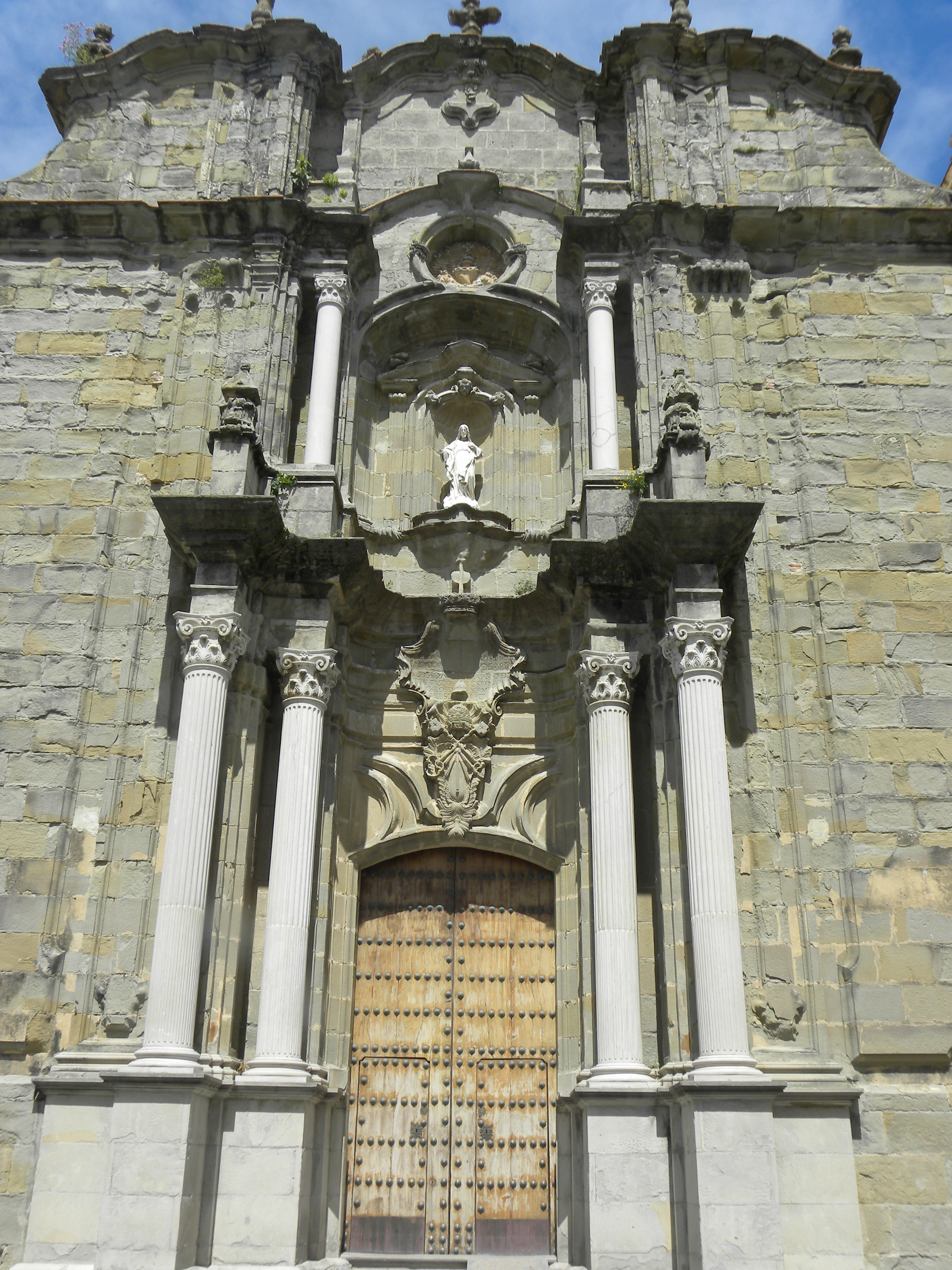

Iglesia de San Mateo (St. Matthew's Church) is the main church of Tarifa in the Province of Cadiz, Spain. It was supposed to have been built in 1506 on the remains of an old mosque, although worship at the church has only been mentioned in documents since 1534, another date given for its inauguration. Numerous alterations have been made to the church over the centuries. The main Baroque facade was designed by architect Torcuato Cayon de la Vega in 1774, and the work was completed four years later under the direction of maestro Carlos Hermida. The bell tower has a square, robust base, and is topped with a fluted dome. The Capilla del Sagrario was restored in 1899, a magnificent dome on scallops that extends to the ground forming three semicircular chapels.
