= Church of Cristo de la Luz =

Catholic chapel and former mosque in Toledo, Spain

- Spanish: Church Cristo de la Luz
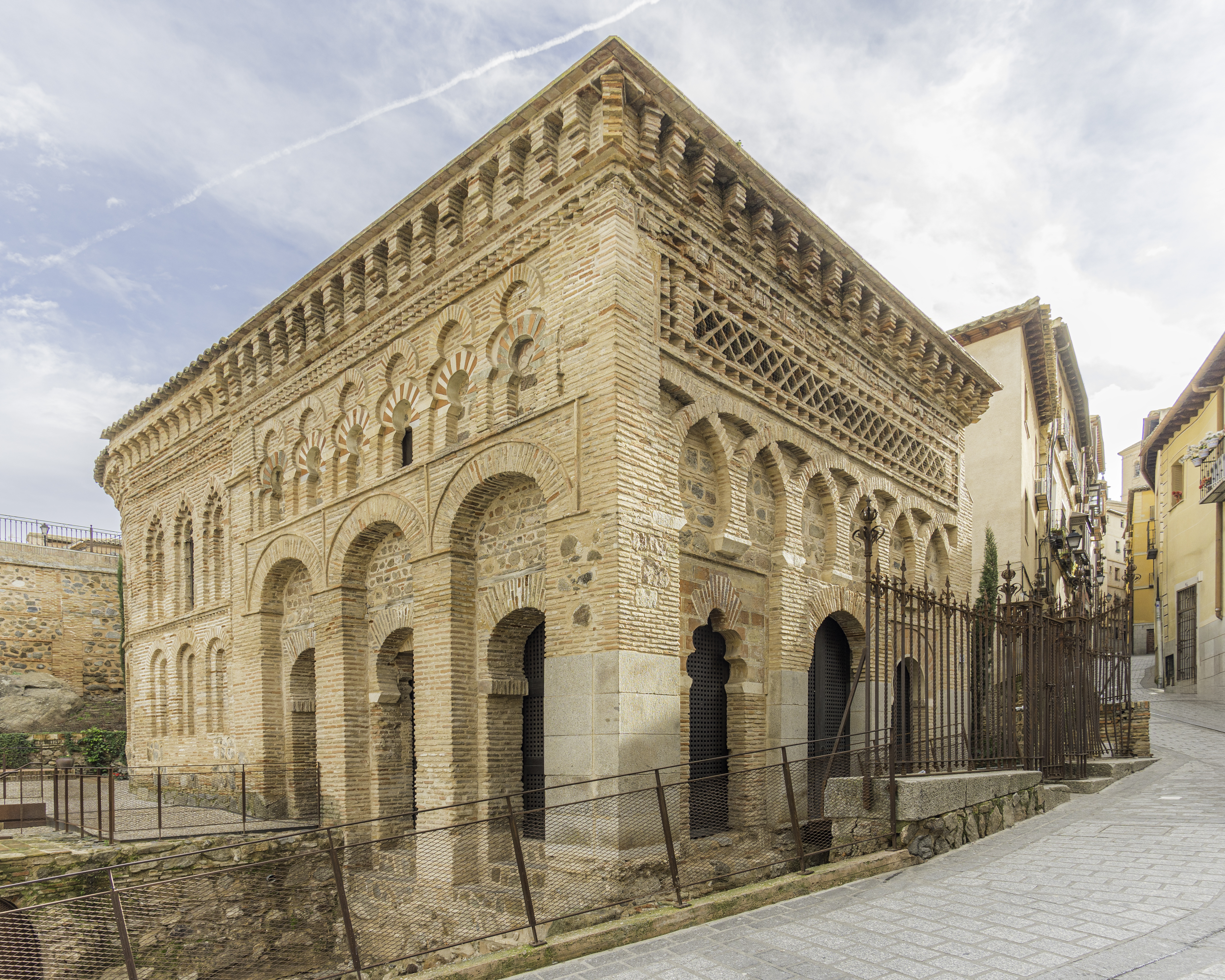
- North-west view

- Location of the chapel in Spain

Religion
- Affiliation: Roman Catholic
- Ecclesiastical or organisational status: Mosque (999–1186); Chapel (since 1186)
- Status: Active (as a chapel)

Location
- Location: Puerta del Sol, Toledo
- Country: Spain
- Coordinates: 39°51′38″N 4°1′27.3″W

Architecture
- Type: Mosque architecture
- Style: Moorish; Mudéjar
- Funded by: Ahmad Ibn Hadidi
- General contractor: Musa Ibn Ali
- Completed: 999 (as a mosque)

Specifications
- Length: 8 m (26 ft)
- Width: 8 m (26 ft)
- Dome: One
- Inscriptions: One
- Materials: Brick; stone

The Church of Cristo de la Luz is a Catholic chapel and former mosque located in Toledo, Spain. It is one of the ten mosques that existed in the city during the period of Muslim rule. Originally known as the Mezquita Bab al-Mardum (مسجد باب المردوم), its name was derived from the nearby city gate, Bab al-Mardum. The building is situated near the Puerta del Sol, in a district historically known as the Medina, where affluent Muslims once resided.

== History ==
The mosque was built in 999 AD in Toledo, during the rule of the Umayyad Caliphate of Córdoba. Commissioned by Ahmad Ibn Hadidi, who belonged to a prestigious elite Toledan family. An inscription in Kufic script on the southwest façade identifies Musa Ibn 'Alī as the builder. This inscription, created using brick, provides key details about the mosque's foundation: identifying its patron, motives behind its construction, the architect, and date.

Bismila (in the name of Allah). Ahmad ibn Hadidi had this mosque erected using his own money requesting a reward in paradise for it from Allah. It was completed with the aid of Allah under the direction of Musa ibn Alí, architect and Sa'ada, and concluded in Muharram in 390 (Islamic calendar).

According to legend, which emerged only after the Christianization and remained a Christian tradition, a shaft of light guided King Alfonso VI to a hidden figurine of the crucified Christ, which had remained concealed for centuries. In commemoration, the king left his shield in the chapel with an inscription that read: "This is the shield which the King Alfonso VI left in this chapel when he conquered Toledo, and the first Mass was held here". The conquest took place in the year 1085, and the mosque was converted to a church after the Christian conquest.

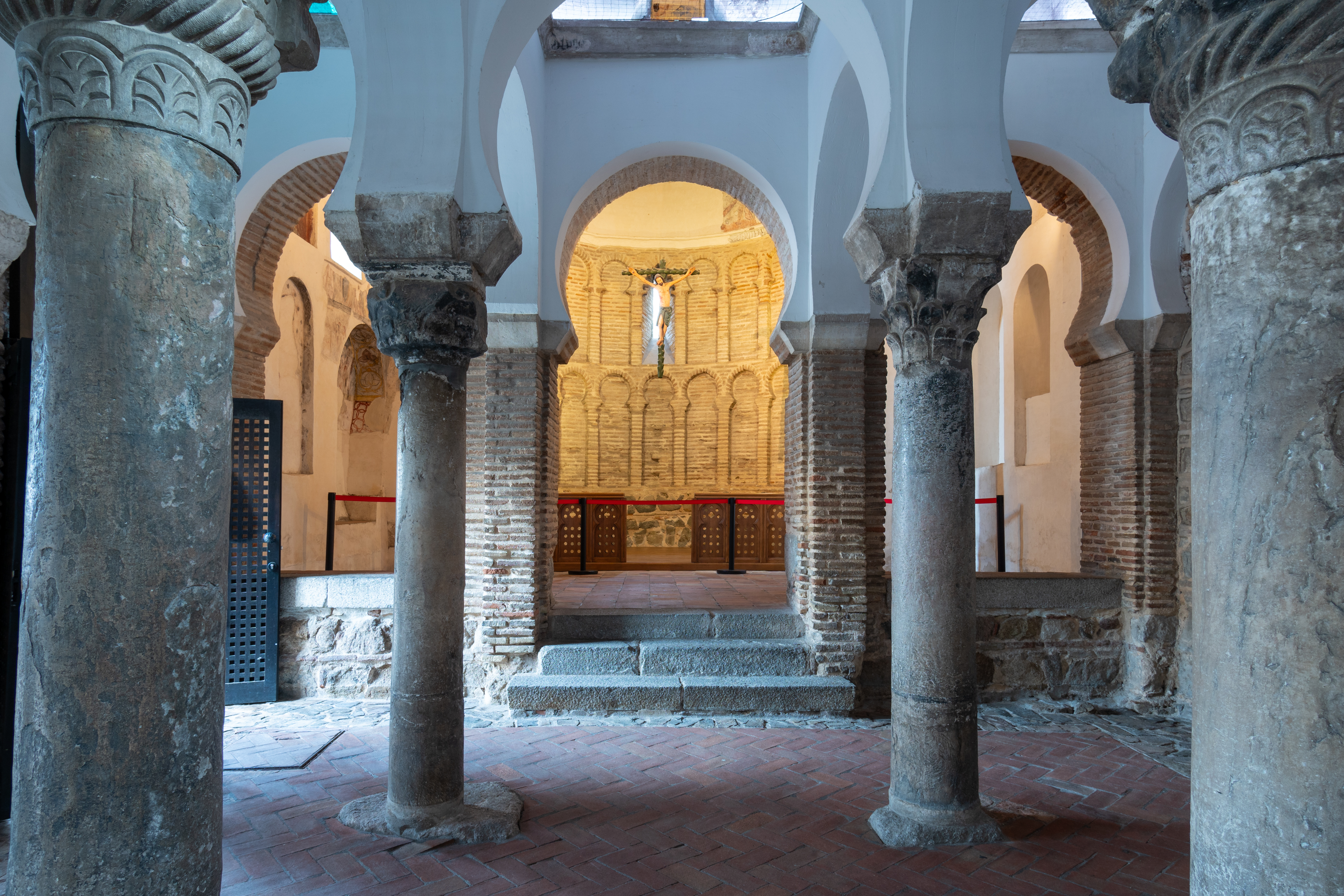
Interior overview and main altar

The legend further recounts that upon capturing Toledo in 1085, also known as the year of the reconquista and the commencement of a period during which it was ritually consecrated for Christian worship, King Alfonso VI arrived at the site, where his horse stumbled in front of the chapel. It is said that a candle had been burning continuously within the cracks of the stone wall throughout the entire period of Muslim rule. Upon further exploration, the king discovered a crucifix, which was later relocated to the Santa Cruz Museum in Toledo. The chapel is traditionally believed to be the site of the first Mass celebrated after the Christian reconquest of the city. This change occurred at a fast rate, creating a marker for Christian dominance assertion and reclaiming Muslim structures, making it a physical marker of conquest.

In 1186, King Alfonso VIII granted the building to the Knights of the Order of St John, who repurposed it as the Chapel of the Holy Cross (Ermita de la Santa Cruz) showing the prior entrusted was a Christian, ensuring permanent Christian control. During this period, the mosque was renamed, and an apse was added to the structure to ensure it could function as a Christian church, as without it, it could not be properly used as a chapel

== Architecture ==
The building is a small, square structure measuring approximately 8 by 8 meters (26 by 26 ft), with a later semi-circular apse added to the east side. Constructed primarily of brick and stone, the mosque features a distinctive interior layout.

The construction techniques of the Mosque of Cristo de la Luz reflect both local building traditions and the architectural influence of the Caliphate of Córdoba. This influence is particularly evident in the brickwork on the façade, which closely resembles that of the Cathedral–Mosque of Córdoba.

=== Exterior ===
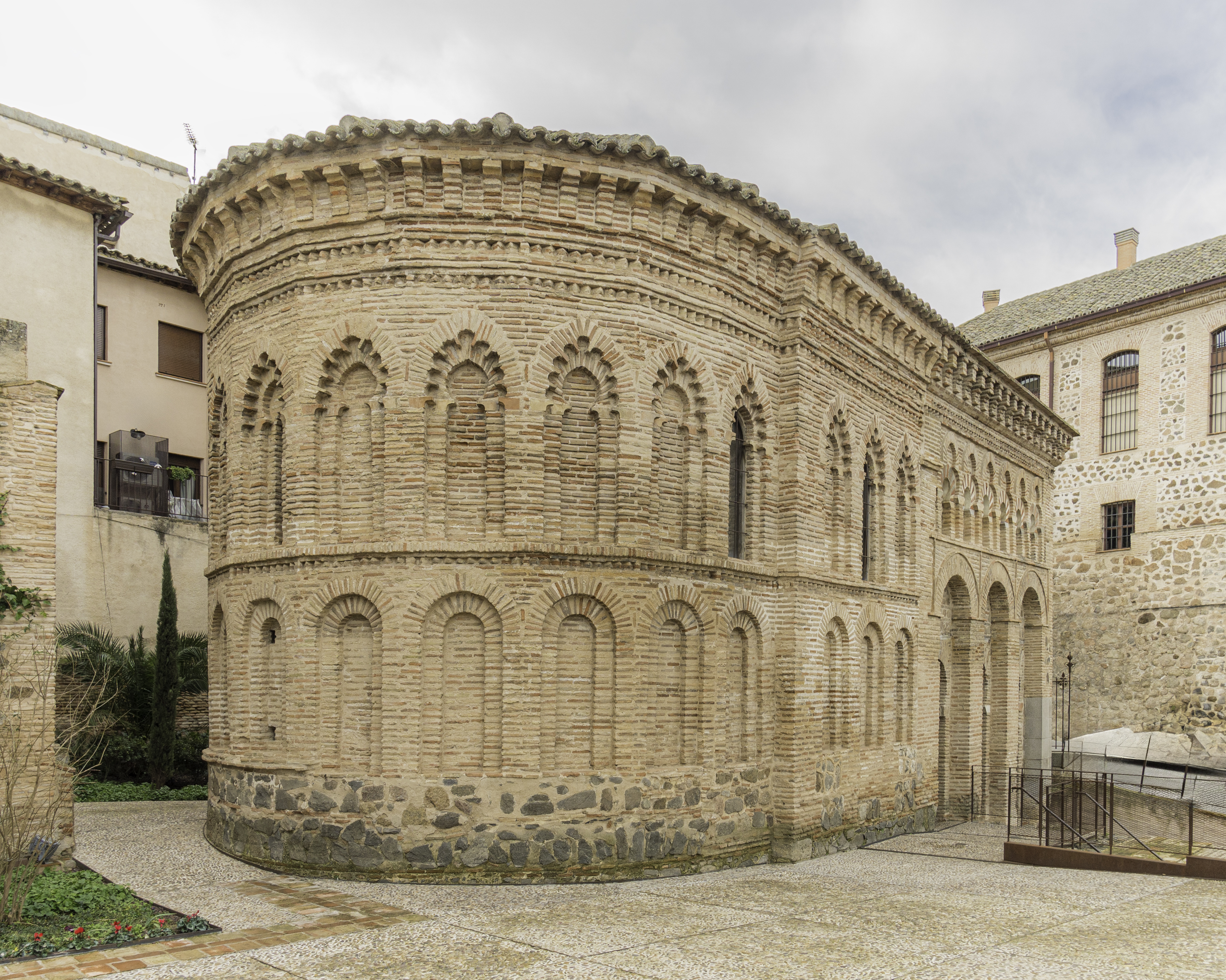
Exterior of the apse, a later addition

Originally, the eastern wall was a continuous expanse of brick, serving as the qibla wall of the mosque. Along this wall, a mihrab would have been present for worship. The former mihrab consisted of a niche set within a square section, slightly larger than the other nine bays of the mosque.

The three remaining façades of the Mosque of Cristo de la Luz feature three-bay arcades, each displaying a similar yet distinct decorative style. The western façade, which originally served as the main entrance, is particularly notable for its unique arrangement of arches. This façade includes a lobed arch, a horseshoe arch, and a wider variation of the horseshoe arch. The decoration consists of brickwork arches, reflecting the architectural influence of the Caliphate of Córdoba.

In later years, a Mudéjar-style semi-circular apse was added to the structure. During this modification, the original qibla wall and mihrab were lost. The incorporation of the Mudéjar style facilitated a seamless transition between the original mosque and the apse, as the addition utilized the same decorative elements and materials. The continuation of the arch motif serves as a unifying architectural feature, linking the two sections of the building.

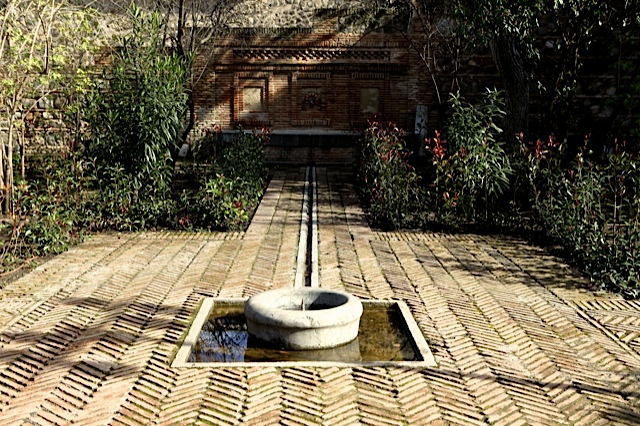
Current garden of the mosque Cristo de la Luz

Adjacent to the building is a small garden, featuring a central fountain.

Its current layout follows a cruciform plan reminiscent of the Persian Charbagh design, introduced into Al-Andalus during the Umayyad period, with two perpendicular axes meeting at a central water basin and fountain. The gardens present planting and structural elements; however are modern, and some observers note that the vegetation and maintenance do not reflect historical Andalusian garden traditions. Although the central water basin appears to be preserved in its original form, the surrounding garden does not replicate the site's original medieval landscaping.

=== Interior ===
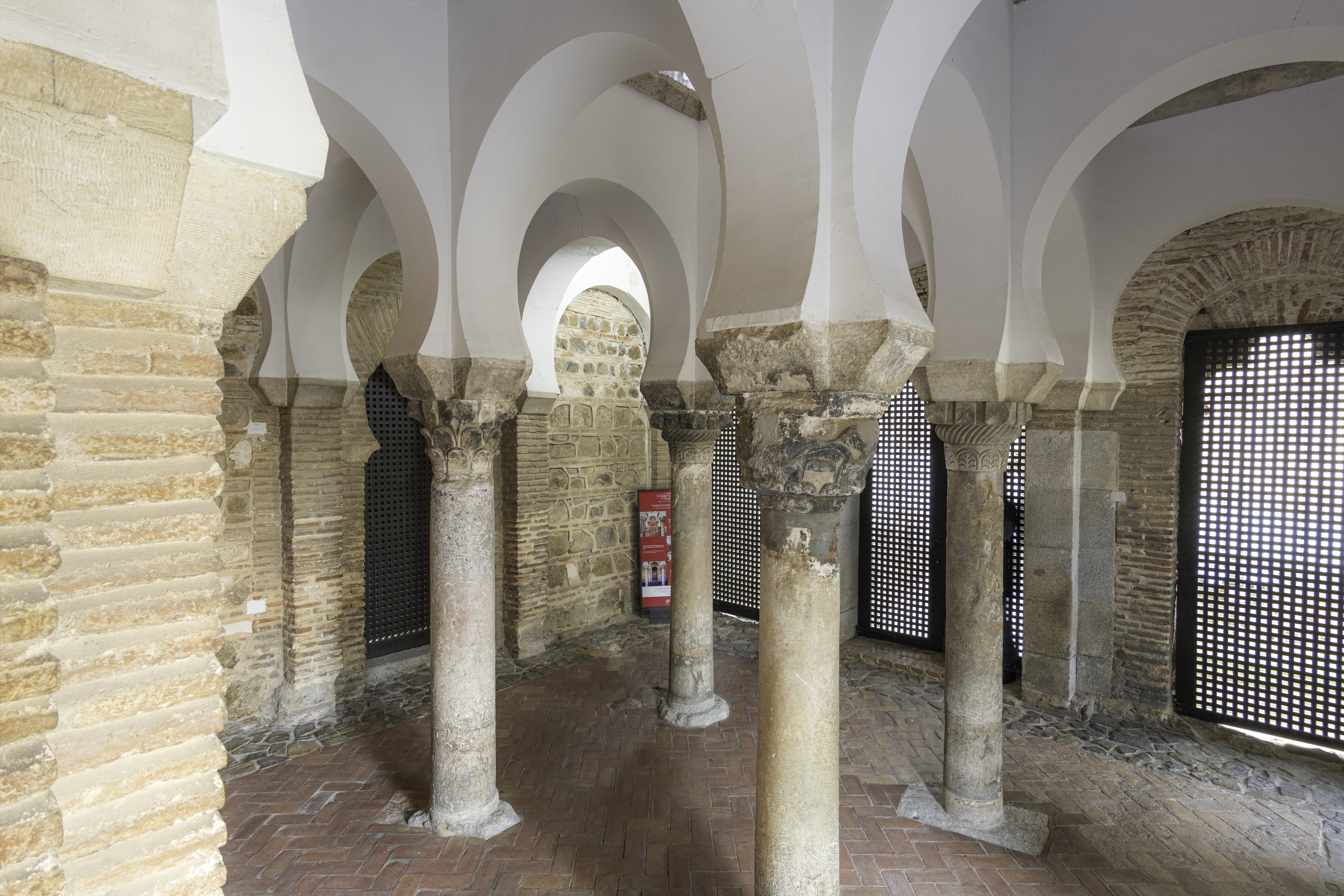
Interior columns

At the center, four columns with carved capitals support horseshoe arches, which divide the interior into nine bays. Each bay is covered by a uniquely designed vault, characterized by the use of ribbed patterns—a hallmark of Islamic architectural tradition. The ribs, following the principles of Islamic design, typically do not intersect at the center, a feature commonly found in Islamic architecture. Some vaults incorporate rectilinear patterns, while others emphasize curvilinear forms, reflecting the artistic and structural heritage of the period.

The central vault is distinguished by its higher cupola, with ribs forming a star-shaped pattern. The columns and capitals are spolia, repurposed from earlier structures, with three capitals of Visigothic origin.

== Religious history ==
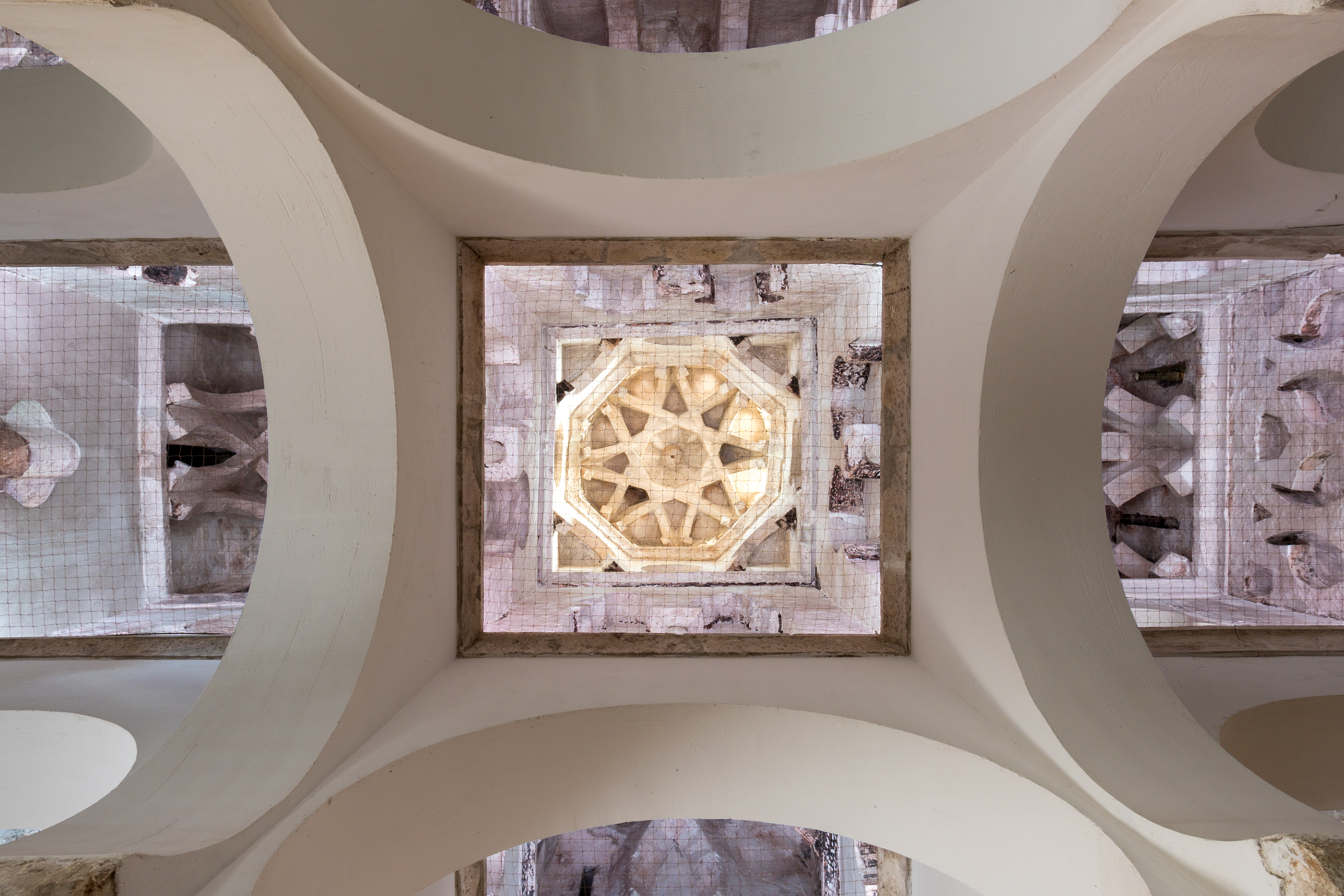
Central Qubba

The mosque was originally constructed during the Islamic era on behalf of Aḥmad Ibn Ḥadīd as a space used for congregational Muslim worship, as well as being a physical symbol of Muslim political power and influence in the city and region. During the Reconquista, Christian forces sought to expel Muslims from the Iberian Peninsula, and following the siege of Toledo, the mosque was seized and repurposed. This transition led to significant renovations, reflecting the shift in religious practices. The original design was adapted for Christian worship, including the addition of an apse containing Romanesque murals, which contrast the lack thereof during the building's Muslim period due to the discouragement of figural imagery in holy spaces. As a result, the building exhibits an overlay of both Muslim and Christian architectural and decorative elements.

Since its repurposing, it remains as a Catholic chapel and a tourist attraction, while still preserving its historical identity as a former mosque. The current name is representative of this amalgamation of identities and the functions it served for the two clashing religions in both periods: “The Mosque of Christ of the Light” acknowledges the building's original designation as a Muslim house of worship, whilst integrating it into the Christian context.

== See also ==
- Mezquita de las Tornerias
- Church of San Sebastián, Toledo
- High medieval domes
