= Mosque of las Tornerías =

Former mosque in Toledo, Spain

- Spanish: Mezquita de las Tornerías
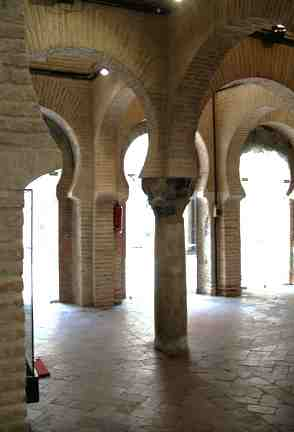
- Prayer hall on the former mosque's upper floor

- Location of the former mosque in the Castile-La Mancha

Religion
- Affiliation: Islam (former)
- Ecclesiastical or organizational status: Mosque (12th–15th century); Profane use (16th–20th century); Museum/Gallery (since 20th century)
- Status: Inactive (as a mosque); Repurposed

Location
- Country: Spain
- Interactive map of Mosque of las Tornerías
- Coordinates: 39°51′31″N 4°01′22″W

Architecture
- Type: Mosque architecture
- Style: Moorish
- Completed: c. 11-12th century

The Mosque of las Tornerías (Spanish: Mezquita de las Tornerías; Arabic: al-Mustimim) is a former mosque in Toledo, in the Castile-La Mancha of Spain. The former Moorish-style mosque was built in the middle of the 11th century on the foundations of Roman architecture, located in the old Muslim neighborhood Arrabal de Francos. Currently it houses the "Center Foundation of Promotion of the Crafts", that can be visited and hosts temporary exhibitions.

The building continued maintaining the Islamic faith in Spain well beyond the reconquista of the city by the Christian troops of Alfonso VI of León and Castile in 1085, until the period of 1498–1505, when it was desacralizated by the Catholic Monarchs. Already as a building for civil use, it went through various vicissitudes, first as an inn in 1505 and then as the headquarters of different businesses and small factories or as a simple home. Its history was lost until the late 19th century, when historians investigating its origins didn't know whether it was a synagogue or a mosque. After the studies, on 15 March 1905, the finding of an Arab mosque in the street of the Tornerías was officially communicated to the Real Academia de la Historia.

== Architecture ==
Historians have determined that the former mosque was completed at some stage during either the second half of the 11th century or the second half of the 12th century.

The mosque was built on the walls of Roman drinking water tanks for distribution of drinking water throughout the city. The great unevenness of the terrain makes its layout in two floors possible, which is unique. The ground floor, which is accessed from the street of the Tornerías, opens to the Roman water tanks with granite half-point arches. The upper floor houses the place of worship, retaining remains of the mihrab and the wall of the qibla.

Its construction was made based on one of the main mosques of the city of Toledo, the Mosque of Cristo de la Luz or of Bab al-Mardum of the 10th century. Its plan is irregular square and the interior spaces are organized like the former in a plan of nine square compartments, covered by sail-vault domes of brick, except the central one, with special relevance of its ribbed dome. The building has horseshoe arches on low columns with large capitals.

== Gallery ==
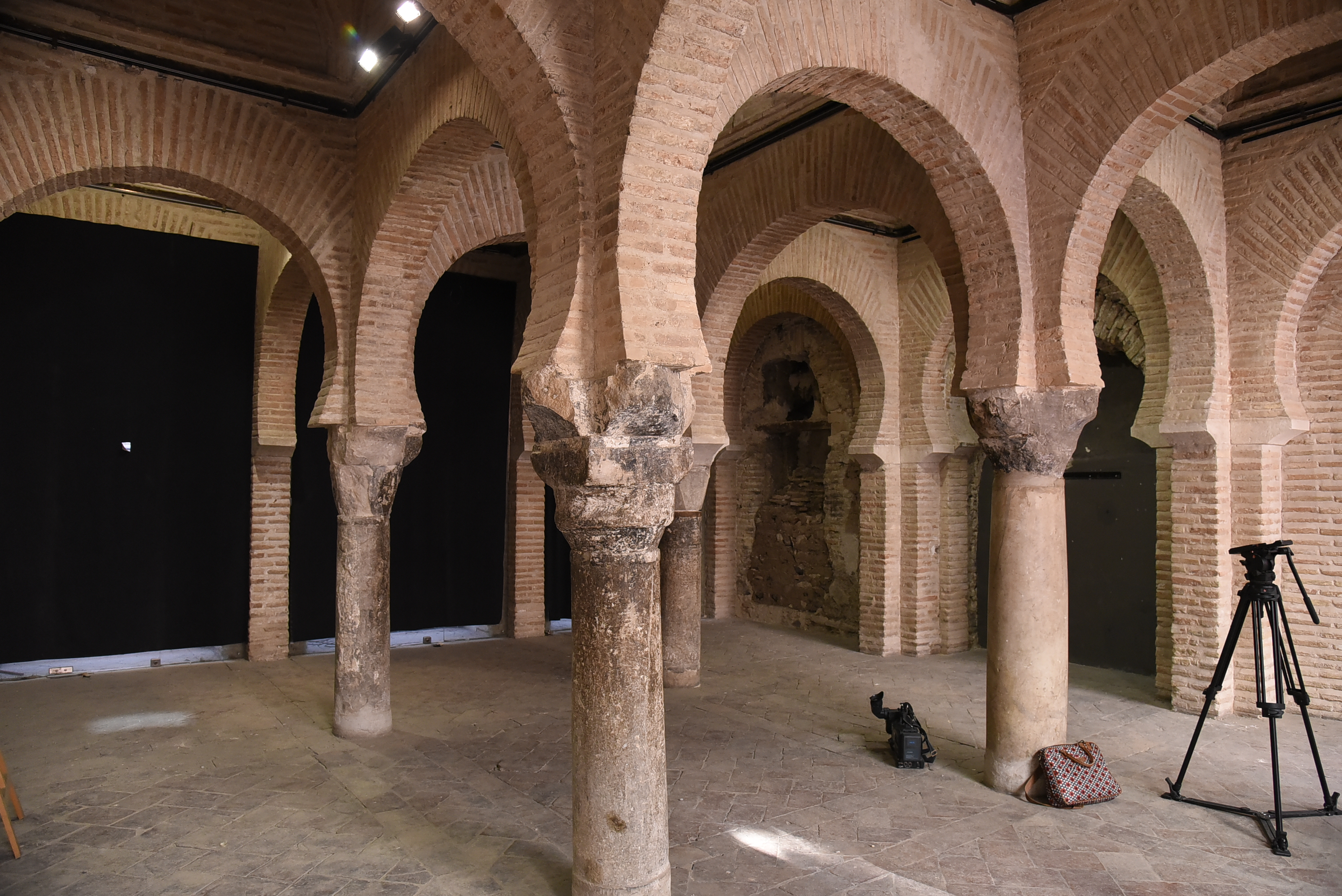
Arches in former prayer hall

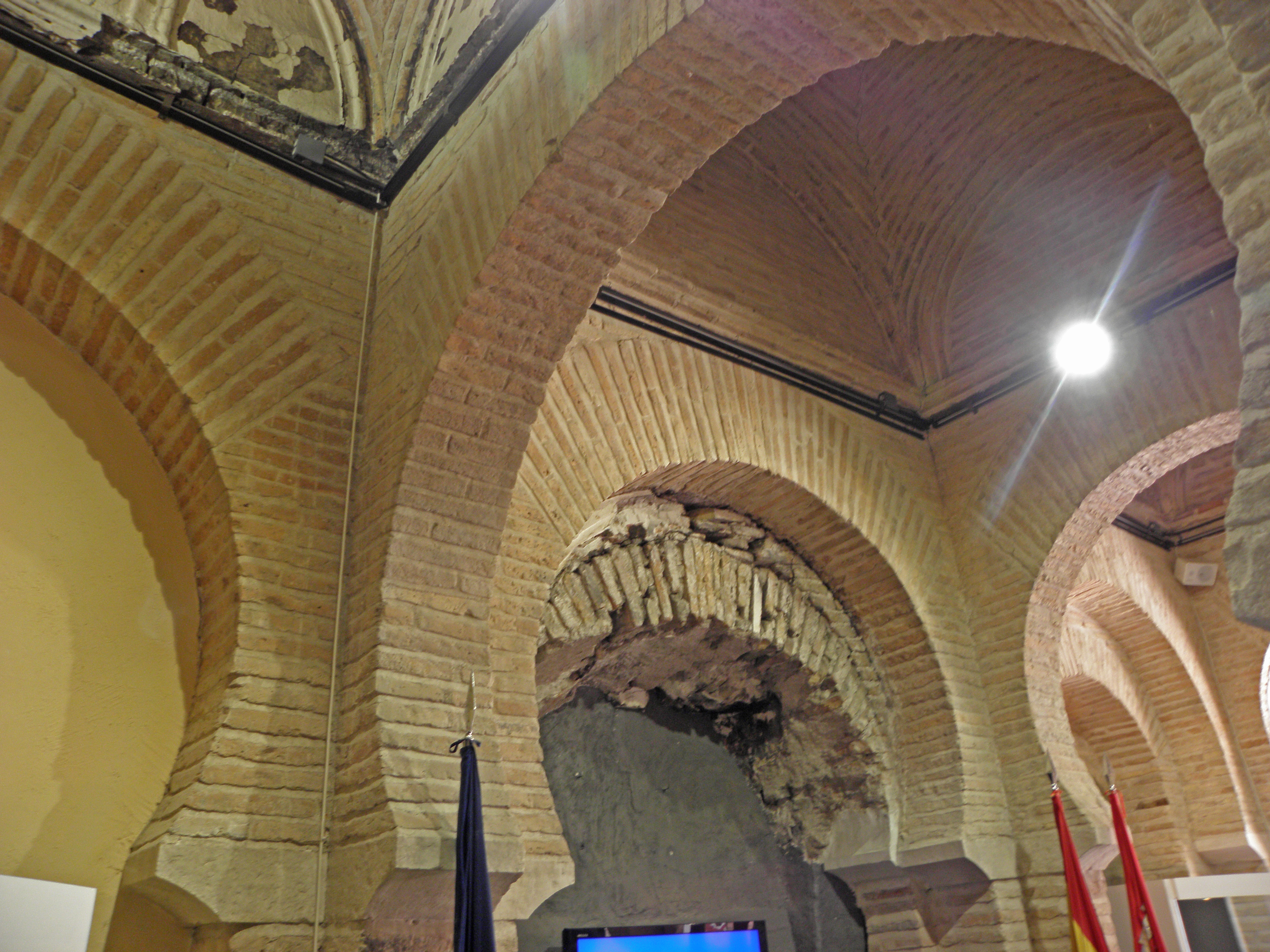
Horseshoe arches inside prayer room

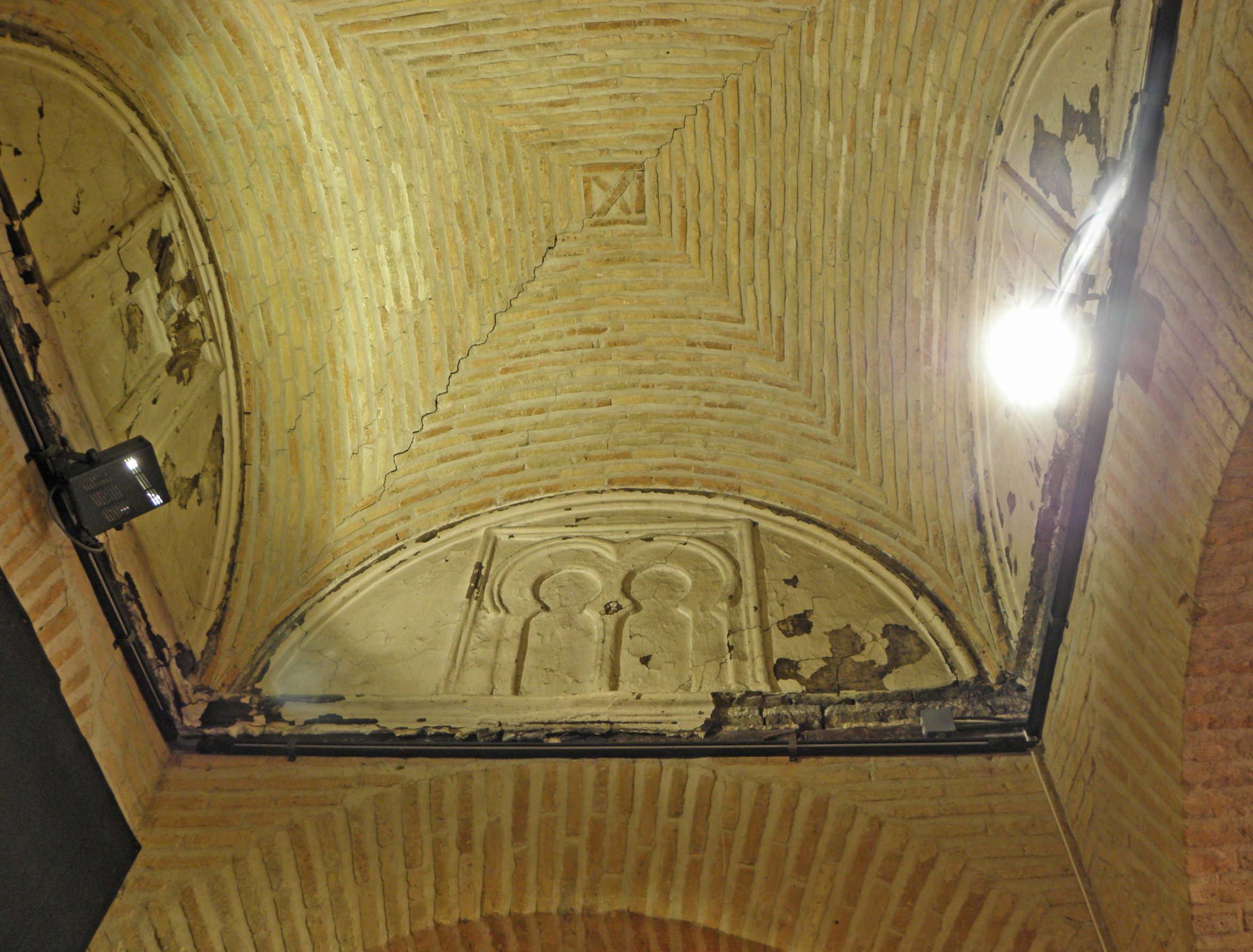
Roof

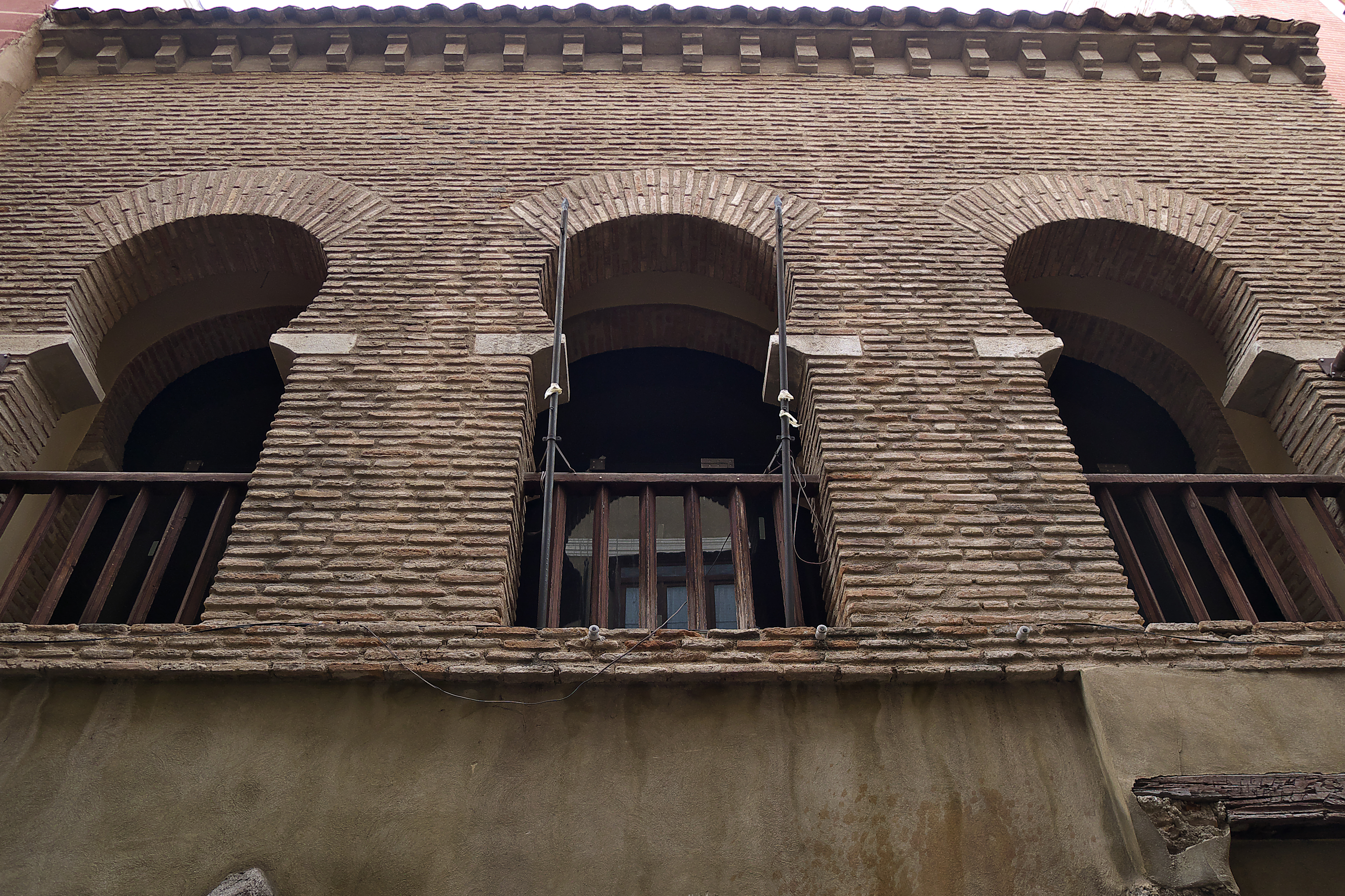
Top floor exterior

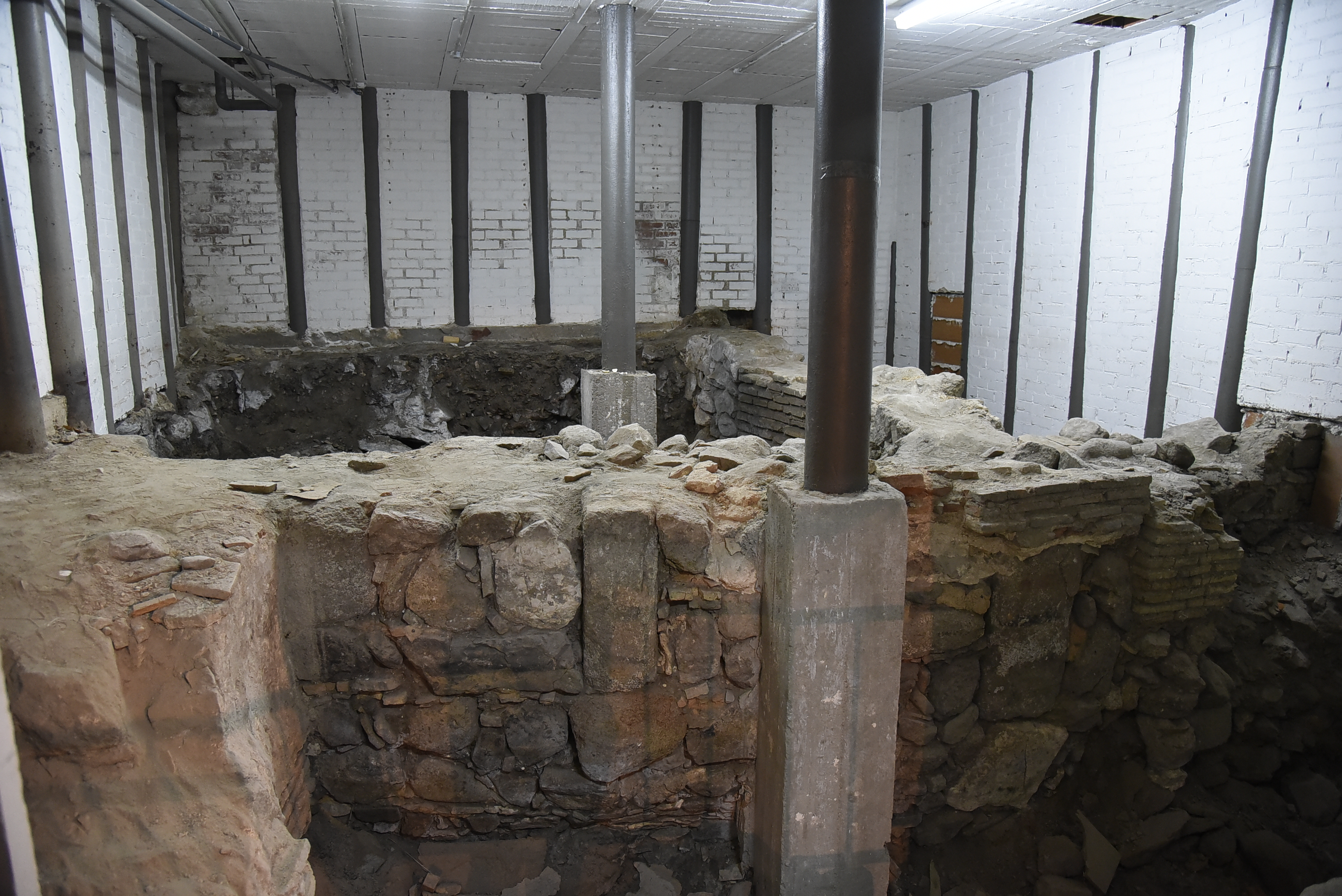
Restoration work

== See also ==
- Mosque of Cristo de la Luz
- List of former mosques in Spain

== Additional reading ==
- de Montêquin, Francoise (1976). Compendium of Hispano-Islamic Art and Architecture. St. Paul: Hamline University Press. pp. 209–210.
