= Árchez =

- Municipality
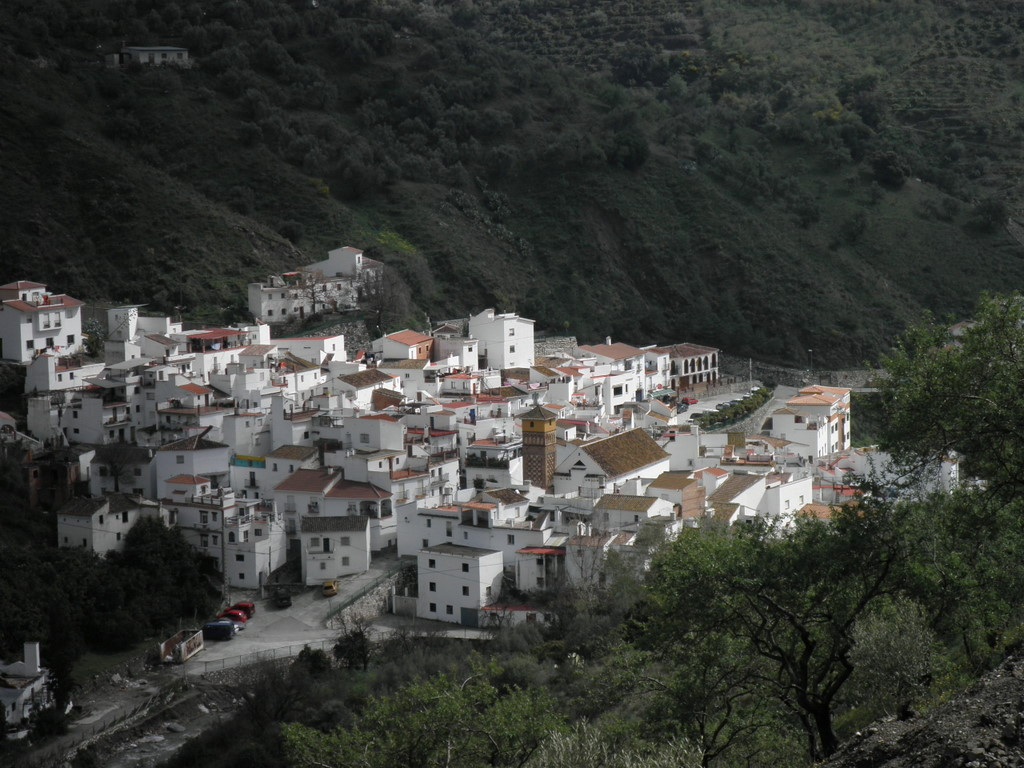

- Flag Coat of arms

- Municipal location in the Province of Málaga

- Location in Spain
- Coordinates: 36°50′20″N 3°59′26″W
- Country: Spain
- Community: Andalusia
- Province: Málaga
- Comarca: Axarquía

Government
  - Mayor: Amalia María Jiménez Jiménez (IU)

Area
  - Total: 4.8 km^{2} (1.9 sq mi)
- Elevation: 530 m (1,740 ft)

Population (2025-01-01)
  - Total: 441
  - Density: 92/km^{2} (240/sq mi)
- Time zone: UTC+1 (CET)
  - Summer (DST): UTC+2 (CEST)
- Postal code: 29753
- Website: www.archez.com

Árchez is a small village in the province of Málaga, in southern Spain. The village is situated approximately 21 kilometres from Vélez Málaga. It has a population of approximately 408 residents, who are known as Archeros.

Archez is located in a valley im the foothills of the Sierra Almijara. The River Turvilla runs through the village.

Adjoined to the parish church of Nuestra Señora de la Encarnacíon is a 16th-century Mudéjar tower whose minaret dates from the 13th century.

== See also ==
- List of municipalities in Málaga
