= Church of San Román, Toledo =

Church in Toledo, Castile-La Mancha, Spain

Coordinates: 39°51′30″N 4°01′37″W

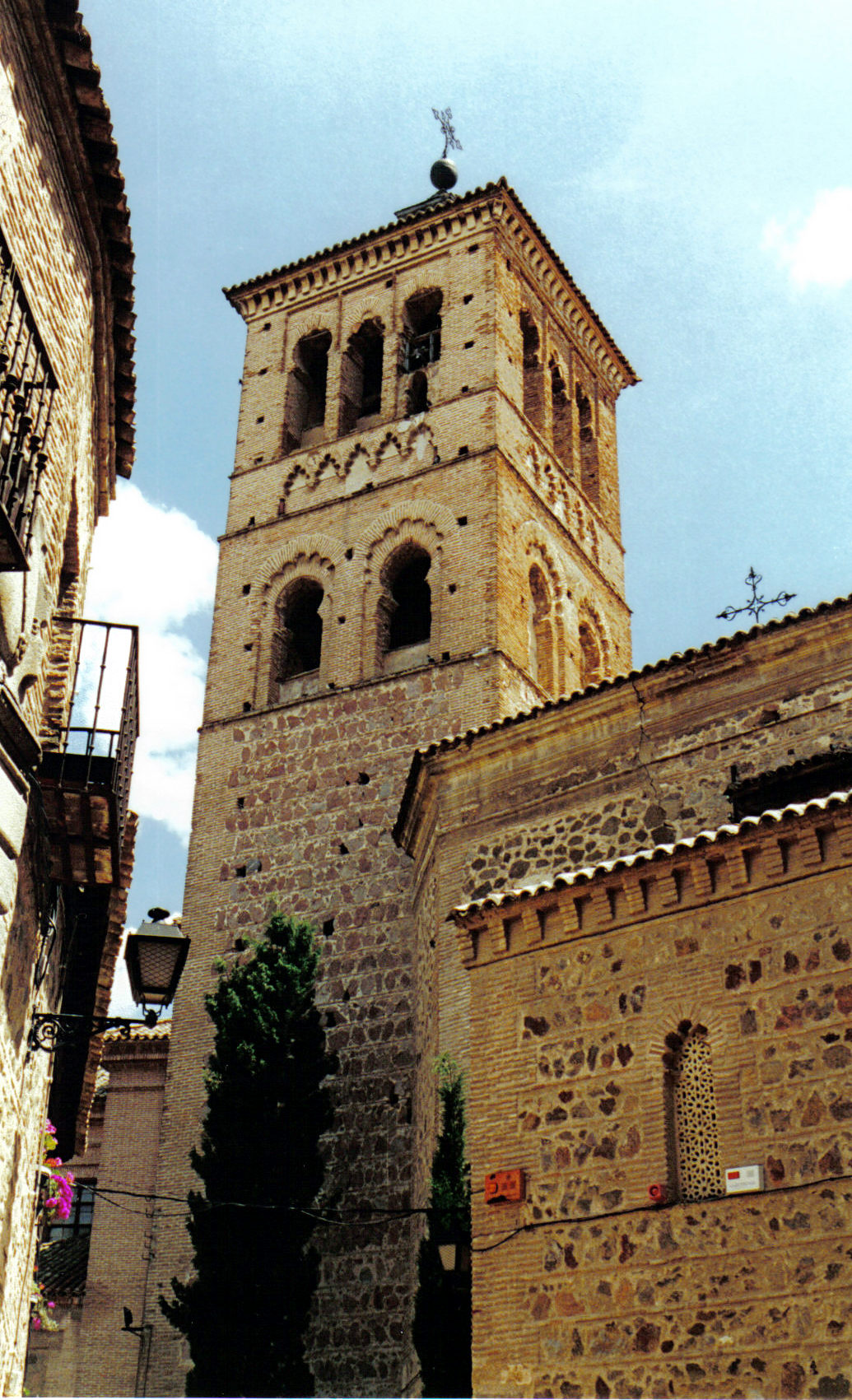
Tower of the church

The Iglesia de San Román is a church in Toledo (Castile-La Mancha, Spain). The church was built in the Mudéjar style in the 13th century. On this site there was an old Visigothic structure and probably an ancient Roman building.

The building is protected by a heritage listing. It currently houses a Visigothic museum, the "Museum of the Councils and Visigothic Culture" (the councils in question are the Councils of Toledo, the earliest of which assembled in 400).

== History and description ==
It is located in one of the highest places of the city, on the second of the twelve hills that form it. There is already news of the parish in the 12th century and the church would be consecrated in 1221 by the archbishop Rodrigo Ximénez de Rada. Tradition indicates that in it Alfonso VIII was crowned king of Castile on 26 August 1166.

The church presents a floor plan with three naves separated by horseshoe arches with alfiz that are supported on pillars. Visigoth and Roman columns attached to capitals are reused from Visigothic origins in some cases, distinguishing themselves by its Corinthian leaves.

Throughout the 13th century a new apse was constructed and the robust tower was built (of Toledan Mudéjar style, with its two upper storeys forming a double belfry and with window openings in groups of two and three, and that would serve as a model for other Toledan towers); In addition to being realized the murals to the fresco in Romanesque painting figurative combined with typically Mudéjar decorations. Of great beauty, these are considered the most southern of Spain. The frescoes are divided into two areas separated by inscriptions. They emphasize the four winged evangelists and the representations of archbishops, the saints Stephen and Lawrence, angels or the Final Judgment.

In the 16th century, Alonso de Covarrubias designed the apse with Plateresque dome of coffers in the main chapel and later covered the paintings, which lost its traces until the first third of the 20th century in which these were rediscovered. It was not until the 1940s that these were recovered where possible.

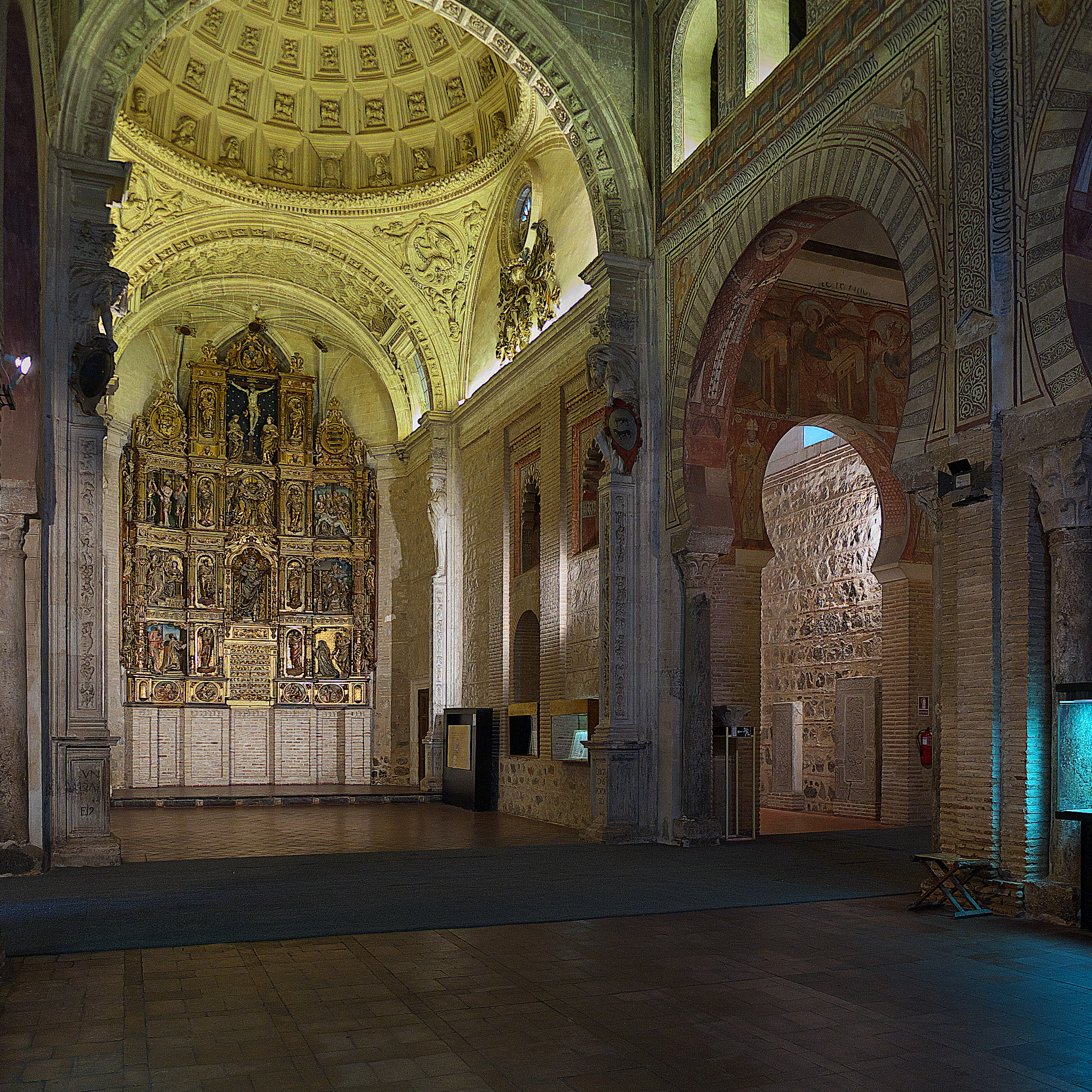
Interior, main chapel.

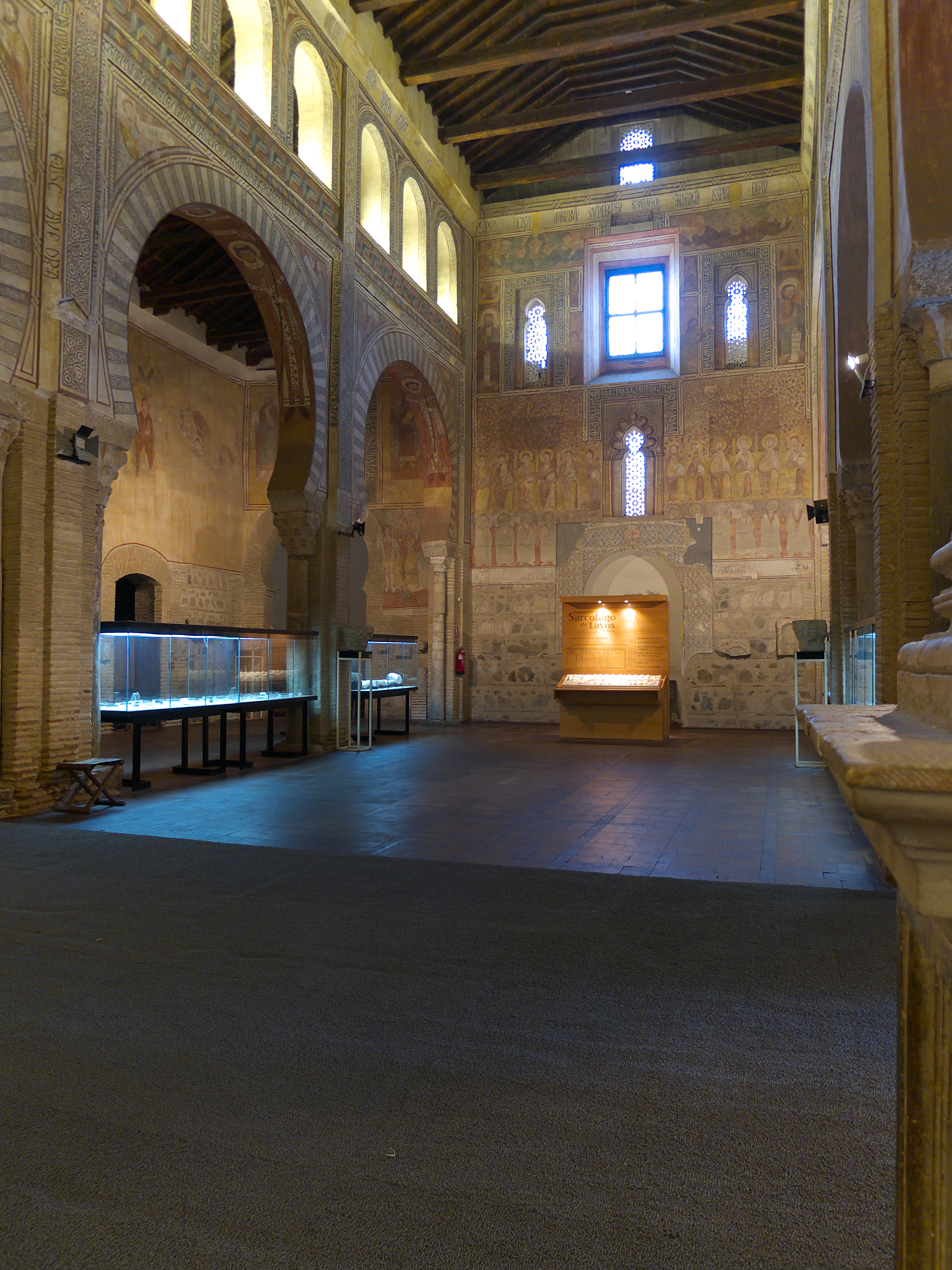
Interior, opposite view.

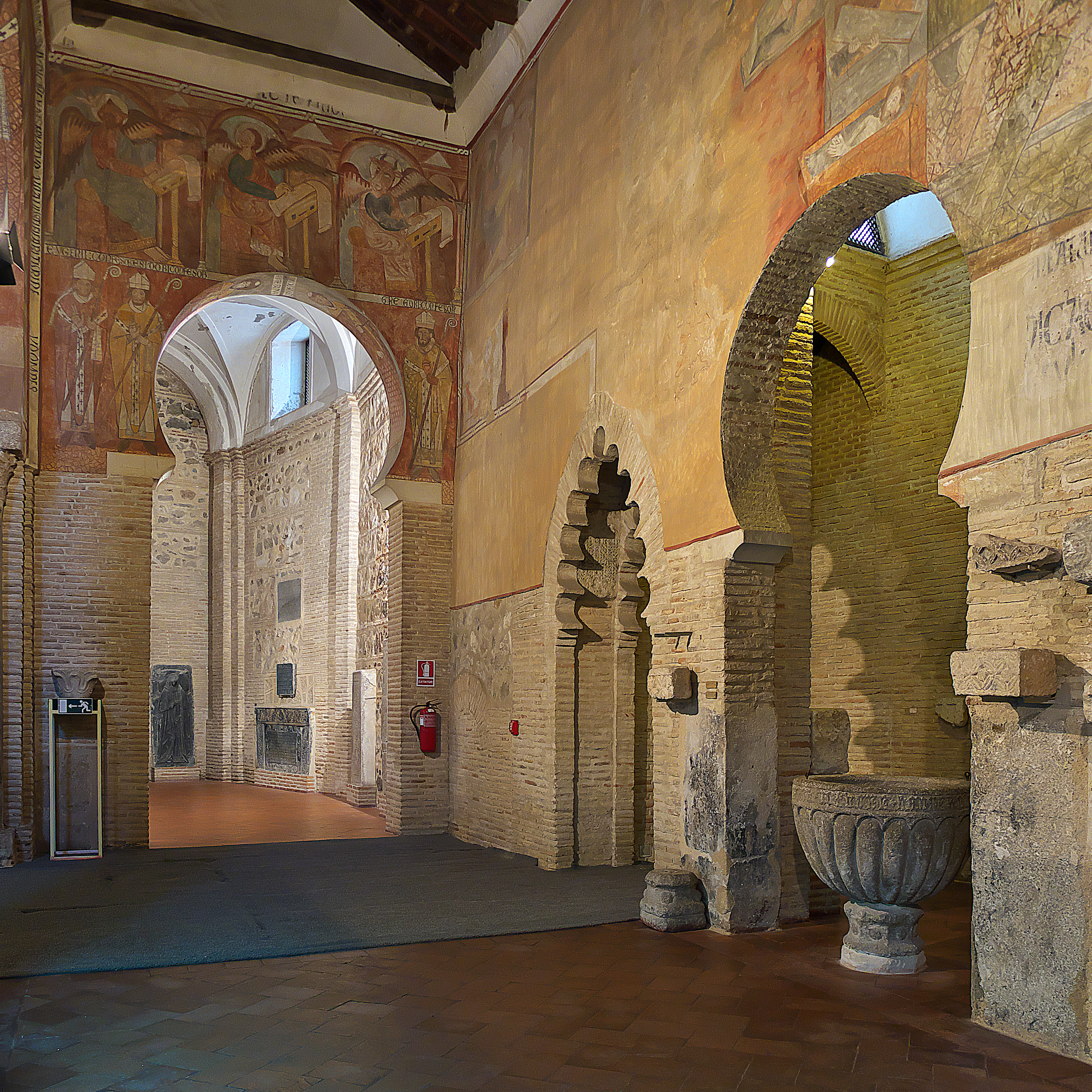
Nave of the Epistle

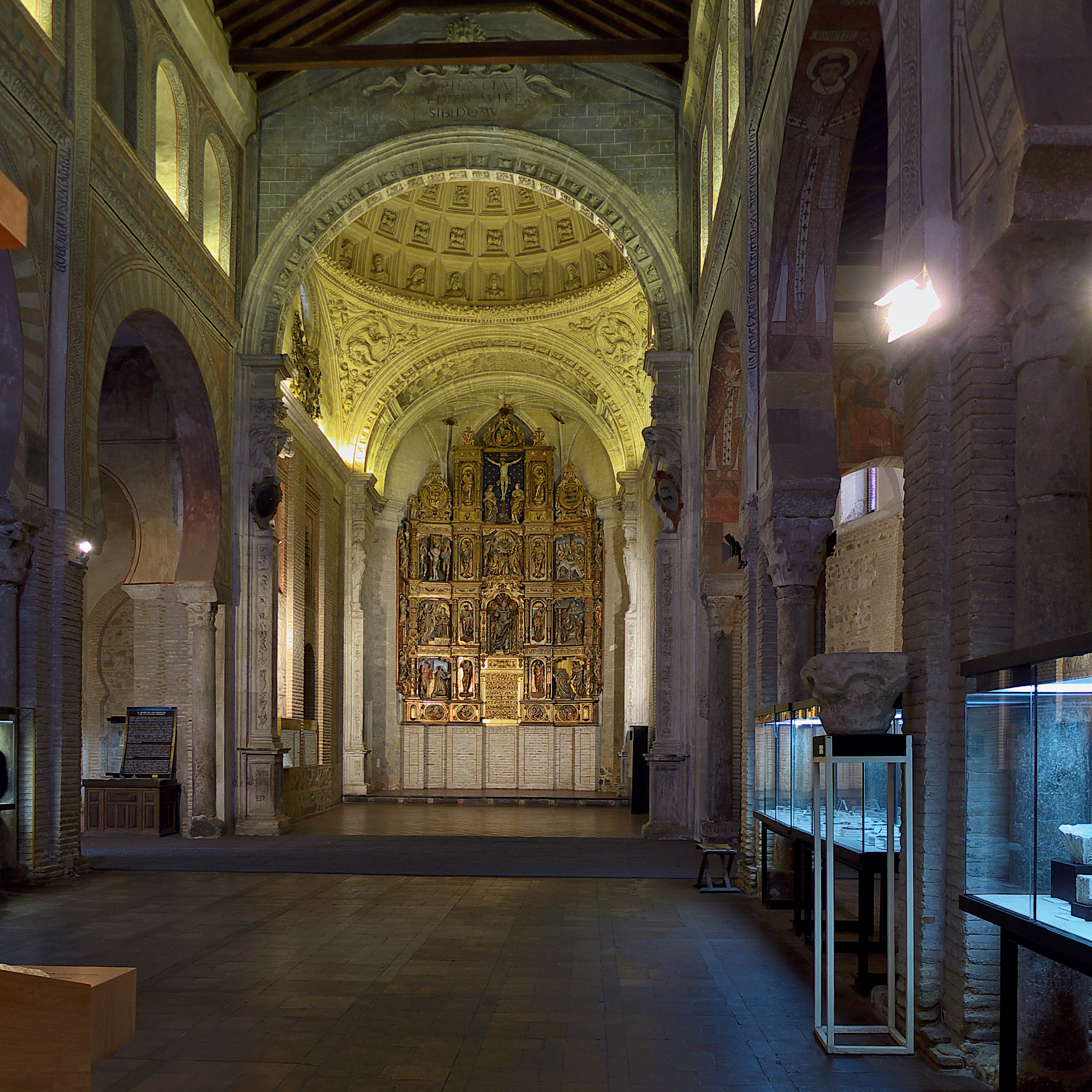
Presbytery
