= Puerta del Sol, Toledo =

Coordinates: 39.8611°N 4.0240°W

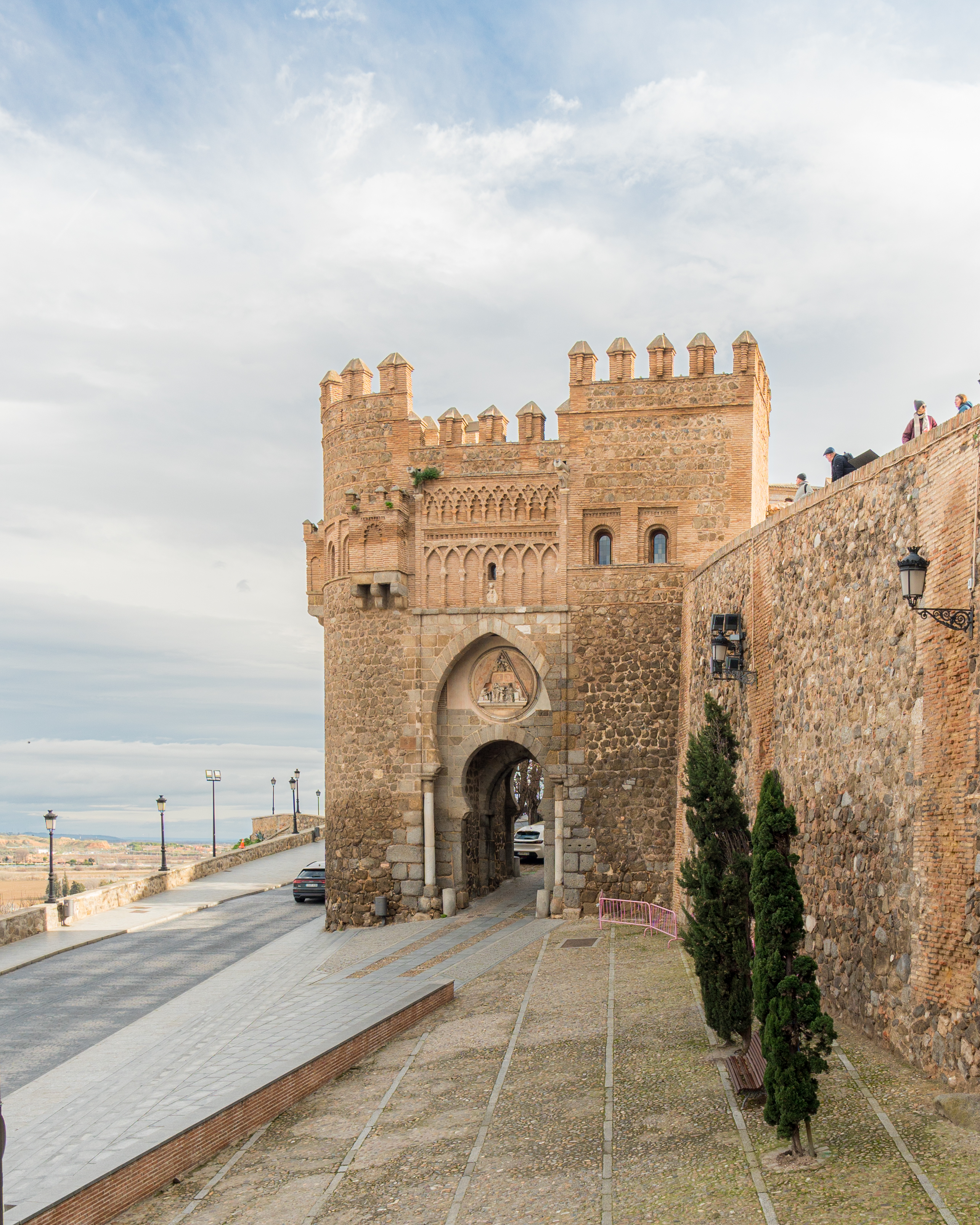
Puerta del Sol

Puerta del Sol (Sun Gate) is a city gate of Toledo, Spain, built by the Knights Hospitaller between the late 13th and early 14th centuries. The gate is a notable example of Mudéjar military architecture, combining Romanesque and Islamic elements.

The medallion above the arch of the gate depicts the ordination of Ildephonsus of Toledo, the city's patron saint, receiving his cassock under the sun and moon. The gate's name derives both from this sun and moon imagery in the medallion and from its eastern orientation toward the rising sun.

The gate's Islamic architectural features, including horseshoe and blind multifoil arches, are so prominent that it was long considered to be a pre-conquest structure. Today, while the gate itself no longer remains in its original form, the entrance and its impressive Moorish architecture continue to serve as a popular monument in the city.
