= Conversion of mosques into non-Islamic places of worship =

Conversion of places of worship

The conversion of mosques into non-Islamic places of worship has occurred for centuries. The most prominent examples of such took place after and during the Reconquista. Outside the Iberian Peninsula, a series of prominent conversions of mosques into churches occurred across various modern imperial contexts, including the Portuguese and Spanish empires in the 16^{th} and 17^{th} centuries and French colonialism in North Africa in the 19^{th} century. In the absence of an official colonial policy, mosque-church conversions were episodic and ranged from building churches on the sites of destroyed mosques to converting functional mosques into churches and, in some strategic cases, cathedrals.

== Conversion of mosques into churches ==
This table lists former mosques with identified original buildings or ruins. It also includes those churches where the original structure of the mosque no longer survives and the church was built at the site of a former mosque. It also includes those that were originally churches that were converted to mosques and later reconverted to churches.

Current name	Mosque Name	Images	City	Country	Year opened	Year closed	Notes	Ref.
Spain
Mosque–Cathedral of Córdoba	Great Mosque of Córdoba (Qurṭuba), Aljama Mosque		Córdoba	Spain	early 8th century	1236	After the Muslim conquest of the Visigothic Kingdom (710~), the site of former main Visigothic church of Cordoba was divided and shared between Muslims and Christians for seven decades. Later, Abd al-Rahman I purchased the Christian part and built the large mosque in 785. Major extensions were added in the 9th and 10th centuries until a final extension in the 10th century under Almanzor. After Christians recaptured Cordoba in 1236, King Ferdinand III of Castile converted the mosque into a cathedral. Later, a cathedral was built at the center of the old mosque, configuring the current Mosque-Cathedral of Cordoba. It was the second largest mosque in the world after Great Mosque in Makkah from the around 9th century, until the Sultan Ahmed Mosque, Istanbul was built in 1588. It had a surface area of 23,400 square metres (2.34 ha) and accommodated an estimated 32,000 to 40,000 worshipers. The current mosque structure dates from 784 to 987.	
Mosque of Cristo de la Luz	Mezquita Bab-al-Mardum		Toledo	Spain	999	1186	Converted into a church. One of the best preserved Moorish mosques in Spain.	
Giralda	Great Mosque of Seville		Seville, Andalusia	Spain		1248	Only minaret remains. Mosque comparable in size to Great mosque of Cordoba, destroyed by earthquake in 1365. Minaret used as a church bell tower was built higher in 16th century.	
Almonaster la Real Mosque			Almonaster la Real	Spain	10th century		Built on site of 5th-century Visigoth basilica. Converted into a church after Reconquista. National Monument since 1931.	
Mezquita del Alcázar de Jerez la Frontera			Jerez de la Frontera (Jerez)	Spain	11th century	mid 13th century	Located within former Moorish fortress of Alcazar of Jerez de la Frontera. Only surviving mosque building of 18 former mosques in the Jerez city. Converted into a church after Reconquista.	
Mosque of las Tornerías	Al-Mustimim		Toledo	Spain	1060		Unusual two-storied mosque. Was built in a busy commercial neighborhood (Arrabal de Francos). Used as a church until 1498–1505, and other uses since. Restoration and preservation done recently.	
Mezquita de Tórtoles			Tarazona	Spain		15th century	Mosque remains almost not altered in the later centuries. Current building was built in 2 stages, one early 15th century, other late 15th century. It is attached to the remains of the old fortified tower of town castle. Converted into a church in 1526.	
Aljama Mosque of Medina Azahara	Aljama Masjid of Madinat al-Zahra		Córdoba	Spain	940	1010	A mosque in Madinat al-Zahra, a vast, fortified Moorish palace-city built by Abd-ar-Rahman III (912–961). The marbled, jeweled complex was plundered & destroyed first by Muslims, then by Christians when the civil war ended the Caliphate of Córdoba. A UNESCO World Heritage site since 2018.	
San Sebastián de Toledo	Al-Dabbagin Masjid		Toledo	Spain		1085~	Converted into a church after the 1085 Christian conquest of the area. Renovated several times but the original interior structure remains. The building is now used as a concert & exhibition hall. Belltower built in the 15th century shows characteristics of a former minaret. Ruins of Arab Baths of Tenerías remain lower below on slope. A short reference to mosque exists by Ibn Baskuwal (1101–83) reported by Fath ibn Ibrahim.	
Small Royal mosque inside Aljafería Palace			Zaragoza	Spain	10th century		Located inside the great fortified palace. A small octagonal mosque, designed as a private oratory for the king and his family. Mosque architecture inspired by the Córdoba mosque. Aljafería is a UNESCO World Heritage site since 1986.	
Mezquita-Iglesia de El Salvador, Toledo			Toledo	Spain	9th century	1085	Mosque built on former Visigoth or Roman substrate. Now a rebuilt church but excavations revealed 9th-century structures & elements of a mosque - horseshoe arch arcade, primitive stone minaret, flooring, courtyard with a cistern.	
Alminar de Árchez, Alminar Mudéjar (Mudejar Minaret of Árchez)	Masyid al-Ta`ibin, Mezquita de los Conversos (Mosque of convert)		Árchez	Spain		14th century	Only 15-meter tall minaret remains, used as the belfry of Árchez church built on mosque location. The minaret is an Almohade architecture monument and the only remaining jewel of the Nazarí period.	
San Sebastian Minaret (Alminar De San Sebastian)			Ronda	Spain		1485	Only minaret of the medium-size mosque in Plaza Abul Beka neighborhood remains. Minaret was expanded and used as a bell tower. The mosque was converted to a church but destroyed in the 1600s during Morisco Revolts. Ronda was a Muslim city for 700 years. The city had 7 or 8 mosques, none survive today.	
Alminar de San Juan (Minaret of San Juan)			Córdoba	Spain	930		Only minaret remains of the mosque built in 930 during 1st Spanish Umayyad caliph 'Abd al-Rahman III. Now it's the belfry of San Juan church.	
Iglesia de Santiago del Arrabal, Toledo			Toledo	Spain			Converted to a church in 1223–25. Caliphate era minaret survives. The church is a Mudéjar style masterpiece, built in 1245–47 on prior structures of a mosque and Visigoth building.	
Church of Nuestra Señora de la Encarnación (Benaque, Macharaviaya)			Macharaviaya	Spain			One of few preserved mosques with original minaret and solid block building built of brick & masonry. Interior single rectangular prayer hall now a church nave. Drilling Mecca facing wall in 2003 showed original mosque construction and 19th-century work. Reconquista era document says "...While it was the visitation and reformation of the houses in the alcayua (or alamiya) in Benaque, the inhabitants used mosque as a parish church, where they had images and heard Mass...".	
Portugal
Church of Nossa Senhora da Anunciação	Aljama mosque of Martulah	Igreja Matriz de Mértola	Mértola (Alentejo)	Portugal	9th Century		Best identifiable and unique former mosque in Portugal; a mixture of Almohad and Manueline post-Gothic architecture. The mosque was last rebuilt in the second half of 12th century but some elements date to the 9th century. In 1532 the, church modified the mosque building reducing its size from 6 sections & 20 columns to 4 sections & 12 columns.	
Church of São Clemente (Loulé)		Loule Church - The Algarve, Portugal (1399505908)	Loulé (Algarve)	Portugal	11th Century		Only some parts of the original minaret of a former mosque exist, used as a church bell tower. It's 22.7 meters tall and 4.2 meters across. The church was built in the 13th century and is the oldest in Loulé. Across it lies the old Arab cemetery of Jardim dos Amuados. The square plan and misalignment in the orientation of the church building also indicate the presence of a former mosque.	
Igreja de Santa Maria do Castelo (Tavira)		TaviraCasteloChurch-CCBY	Tavira (Algarve)	Portugal	12th Century		A mosque stood at the highest point within the fortified Medina of Tavira on the location where the Church of Santa Maria stands. Recent excavations unearthed rubbish heaps with 11-12th century materials and dwellings from the first half of the 12th century. A slight canonical disorientation of the church is indicative of the structure originally being a mosque. In 1718, a tomb was found with a corpse accompanied by a Moorish Alfange blade.	
Gibraltar
Shrine of Our Lady of Europe		Shrine of Our Lady of Europe in Gibraltar (3)	Europa Point	Gibraltar		1309	The mosque was built by Muslim troops at Europa Point, the southernmost part of Gibraltar. In 1309, King Ferdinand IV of Castile took Gibraltar, driving the Muslim troops back across the strait to Africa. The King converted the ancient mosque into a Christian Shrine. The Muslims again captured Gibraltar 24 years later in 1333. In 1462 King Henry IV recaptured Gibraltar and restored the devotion to Our Lady of Europe initiated by his grandfather, Ferdinand, once again transforming the ancient mosque into a Christian Shrine.	
Cathedral of St. Mary the Crowned		Cathedral of St. Mary the Crowned west	Gibraltar	Gibraltar		1462	The current cathedral stands at the site of the principal mosque in the center of the city. After the reconquest of the city, the mosque was stripped of its Islamic past and consecrated as the parish church (named Santa Maria la Coronada y San Bernardo). However, under the rule of the Catholic Monarchs, the old building was demolished and a new church was erected, in Gothic style. The cathedral's small courtyard is the remnant of the larger Moorish court of the mosque.	
Bulgaria
Seven Saints Church	Black Mosque	SvetiSedmochislenitsiChurch-Sofia-3	Sofia	Bulgaria	1528	1878	The Black Mosque was built on the order of Suleiman the Magnificent with the intention to be more impressive and beautiful than the Christian churches in the city. The mosque is popularly attributed to the famous Ottoman architect Mimar Sinan, although this is uncertain. The mosque is called the Black Mosque, after the dark granite from which its minaret was made.	
Church of the Assumption		Churchoftheassumptionuzundzhovo	Uzundzhovo	Bulgaria	16th Century	1878	The mosque is believed to have been built by celebrated Ottoman architect Mimar Sinan and was originally a part of a caravanserai. It was consecrated into a church in 1906.	
Greece
Saint Nicholas church	Eski Mosque		Drama	Greece	1389–1566	1916	Its building is associated with both Sultan Bayezid I and Bayezid II. It was first converted into a church by the Bulgarians.	
St. Paraskeva church	Yakup Bey Mosque		Giannitsa	Greece	15th century	1910s	Its construction date is unclear, but it was around the 15th century. Its was conversion into a church took place in the late 1940s.	
Saint Nicholas church	Ibrahim Pasha Mosque	20120726 Agios Nikolaos former Ibrahim Pasa Ottoman Mosque Kavala Greece	Kavala	Greece	1530	1920s	The mosque was built in 1530 by Ibrahim Pasha, the Vizier of Suleiman II and was the largest mosque of Kavala. In the 1920s the mosque was transformed into a church and the base of the minaret was used to build the bell tower.	
Saints Constantine and Helen church	Beshir Agha Mosque ?		Argos	Greece	1570–1600	1871	Only surviving mosque in Argos, whose original name is still debated. It was converted into a church in 1871, without major modifications.	
Transfiguration of the Saviour church	Murad III Mosque		Pylos	Greece	c. 1577	1842	Authorised by Sultan Murad III, and spent multiple decades alternating between mosque and church until its final conversion in 1842 after Greece's independence.	
Saint John church	Ankebut Ahmed Pasha Mosque		Ierapetra	Greece	17th century	Post-1912 (?)	It is one of the two remaining Ottoman mosques in the town of Ierapetra. The mosque was converted into a church for Saint John.	
Transfiguration of the Saviour church	Iç Kale Mosque		Nafplio	Greece	19th century	1839	One of the three mosques of Nafplio, t was converted into a church for the Catholic church in 1839, shortly after independence.	
Saint Titus Cathedral	Yeni Mosque		Heraklion	Greece	1869	1925	The original building was a converted church, but the current building was erected later in 1869, and converted into a church in 1925.	
Holy Trinity church	Sigri Mosque		Sigri	Greece	1870	1923	A two-storey building originally built for the Muslim community, converted after the population exchange between Turkey and Greece.	
Holy Trinity church	Kursum Mosque		Drama	Greece	Late 19th century	After 1918	One of the four surviving mosques of Drama. The base of the destroyed minaret now supports the bell tower.	
Saints Constantine and Helen church	?		Thessaloniki	Greece	1911	1912	The last Ottoman mosque to be built in Thessaloniki, from the materials of a previous one. It was converted the very following year, when Greece annexed the city.	
Others
Downtown Candlemas Church of the Blessed Virgin Mary	Mosque of Pasha Qasim	Pécs - Mosque Church 02	Pécs	Hungary	16th Century	1702	The current building, a hundred steps in length and in width, was built by Pasha Qasim the Victorious between 1543 and 1546. The mosque was converted to a church in 1702, after Habsburg-Hungarian troops reconquered the city. The minaret was destroyed by the Jesuits in 1766. One of the largest Ottoman constructions remaining in Hungary, the building still retains many Turkish architectural characteristics.	
Church of the Holy Archangels Michael and Gabriel		Sfintii Arhangheli Kings Braila	Brăila	Romania	17th Century	19th Century	Originally built by the Ottomans, it was converted into a church after the transfer of the city to Wallachia following the Treaty of Adrianople.	

== Conversion of mosques into Hindu temples ==
This table lists former mosques with identified original buildings that have been converted into temples. It also includes those temples where the original structure of the mosque no longer survives and the temple was built at the site of a former mosque.

Current Name	Mosque Name	Images	City	Country	Notes
Ram Janmabhoomi Temple	Babri Masjid		Ayodhya	India	The 16th-century mosque built on the birthplace of Rama under the reign of and named after Mughal Emperor Babur was demolished in 1992 by a mob of Hindu nationalists. In 2019, after a verdict by the Supreme Court of India, the decision to construct a temple at the site was accepted by the Indian parliament. Archeological Survey of India did excavations and revealed that there was a temple complex underneath the Mosque
Durga Mandir	Jama Masjid of Sonipat		Sonipat	India	The imposing structure is currently being used as a Durga Mandir.
Ram Leela Mandir	Jama Masjid of Farrukhnagar	Chand Minar behind Bharat Mata temple	Farrukhnagar	India	Mughal Emperor Farrukhsiyar had the Jama Masjid constructed as the principal mosque of Farrukhnagar town, which he founded in 1732 CE. It is now being used as a Hindu temple and Sikh Gurdwara.
Bharat Mata Mandir	Khilij Jumma Masjid		Daulatabad (Aurangabad)	India	The Jumma Masjid is the earliest surviving Islamic monument in the Deccan region.
Bhagwan Danasher Mandir	Dana Shir Masjid		Hisar	India	The mosque is built to the west of the courtyard of the Tomb of Dana Shir Bahlul Shah. It is completely built of small bricks and is plastered with fine white stucco.

== Conversion of mosques into gurdwaras ==
This table lists former mosques with identified original buildings that have been converted into Sikh gurdwaras.

Current Name	Mosque Name	City	Country	Notes
Bada Gurudwara	Jama Masjid of Meham	Meham, Haryana	India	One inscription inside the structure dates it to 1531 CE.
Gurdwara Shaheed Bhai Taru Singh	Shaheed Ganj Mosque	Lahore, Punjab	Pakistan	Commissioned during the reign of Mughal Emperor Shah Jahan and construction completed in 1722. Converted to Gurudwara in 1762.
Gol Gurudwara	Gol Masjid	Amritsar, Punjab	India	Reference
Sri Guru Singh Sabha Gurudwara	Khail Bazaar Jama Masjid	Panipat, Haryana	India	Its three ribbed domes rise high above the dense marketplace and its central arch with its decorative iwan bear testimony to its Mughal influence.
Gurudwara Sahib	Purani Masjid	Gidranwali, Haryana	India	Reference
Farukh Nagar Gurudwara	Jama Masjid	Farrukhnagar, Haryana	India	Reference

== Conversion of mosques into synagogues ==
This table lists former mosques with identified original buildings that have been converted into synagogues.

Current Name	Mosque Name	City	Country	Notes
Geulat Israel synagogue	Wadi Hunayn mosque	Nes Ziona	Israel	The former mosque now serves as a Shas-affiliated synagogue. "The Geulat Israel synagogue, founded 5708 (1948)," reads a sign at the entrance.
Shaarei Zion synagogue	Yazuri mosque	Azur	Israel	The walls of the building have been fixed up, but a closer look at the forest of domes on the roof reveals a Mamluk style, similar to that of many buildings in Jerusalem's Old City. The mosque was built in the 12th century on top of a church, which was itself preceded by a synagogue.
Sulam Yaakov synagogue	Sumayil mosque	Tel Aviv	Israel	Sumayil was a village largely inhabited by Bedouins hailing from Northern Sinai. This original structure was built by them.

== See also ==
- Conversion of non-Islamic places of worship into mosques

== Bibliography ==
- Ameen, Ahmed (2017). Islamic architecture in Greece: Mosques. Alexandria, Egypt: Center for Islamic Civilization studies, Bibliotheca Alexandrina.
- Ameen, Ahmed (2019). "Patrons of Ottoman mosques in Greece reconsidered in light of the Ierapetra mosque of Crete". Journal of Islamic Architecture. 5 (3): 137–144. doi:10.18860/jia.v5i3.5365. ISSN 2086-2636.
- Kolovos, Elias (2015). "Monuments sans héritiers? Les édifices ottomans de Crète". Anatoli (in French). 6: Patrimoines culturels et fait minoritaire en Turquie et dans les Balkans.
- Kontogiannis, Nikos D.; Grigoropoulou, Ioanna M.; Barmparitsa, Eleni; Sakkari, Sophia; Moutafi, Ioanna; Lagia, Anna; Karali, Lilian (2015). "From Mosque to Church and Back Again: Investigating a House of Faith in Post-Medieval Pylos". Hesperia: The Journal of the American School of Classical Studies at Athens. 84 (4): 771. doi:10.2972/hesperia.84.4.0771.
- Konuk, Neval (2008). Ottoman architecture in Lesvos, Rhodes, Chios and Kos islands. Ankara: The Center for Strategic Research. ISBN 978-9757307693.
- Loukma, Maria (2019). Τεχνολογία, υλικά δόμησης και παθολογία σε θρησκευτικά κτήρια της Οθωμανικής περιόδου [Technology, construction materials and pathology in religious buildings of the Ottoman period] (PDF) (Thesis) (in Greek). Thessaloniki, Greece: Aristotle University of Thessaloniki.
- Pantazis, Georgios; Lambrou, Evangelia (2009). "Investigating the orientation of eleven mosques in Greece". Journal of Astronomical History and Heritage. 12 (2): 15–166. Bibcode:2009JAHH...12..159P. doi:10.3724/SP.J.1440-2807.2009.02.08. ISSN 1440-2807. S2CID 55073167.
- Stavridopoulos, Ioannis (2015). Μνημεία του άλλου: η διαχείριση της οθωμανικής πολιτιστική κληρονομιάς της Μακεδονίας από το 1912 έως σήμερα [Monuments of the Other: The Management of Ottoman Cultural Heritage in Macedonia from 1912 to the Present Day] (Thesis) (in Greek). Ioannina: University of Ioannina.
