= Ermita de Nuestra Señora de la Estrella, Toledo =

Hermitage in Toledo, Spain

Coordinates: 39.8615°N 4.0254°W

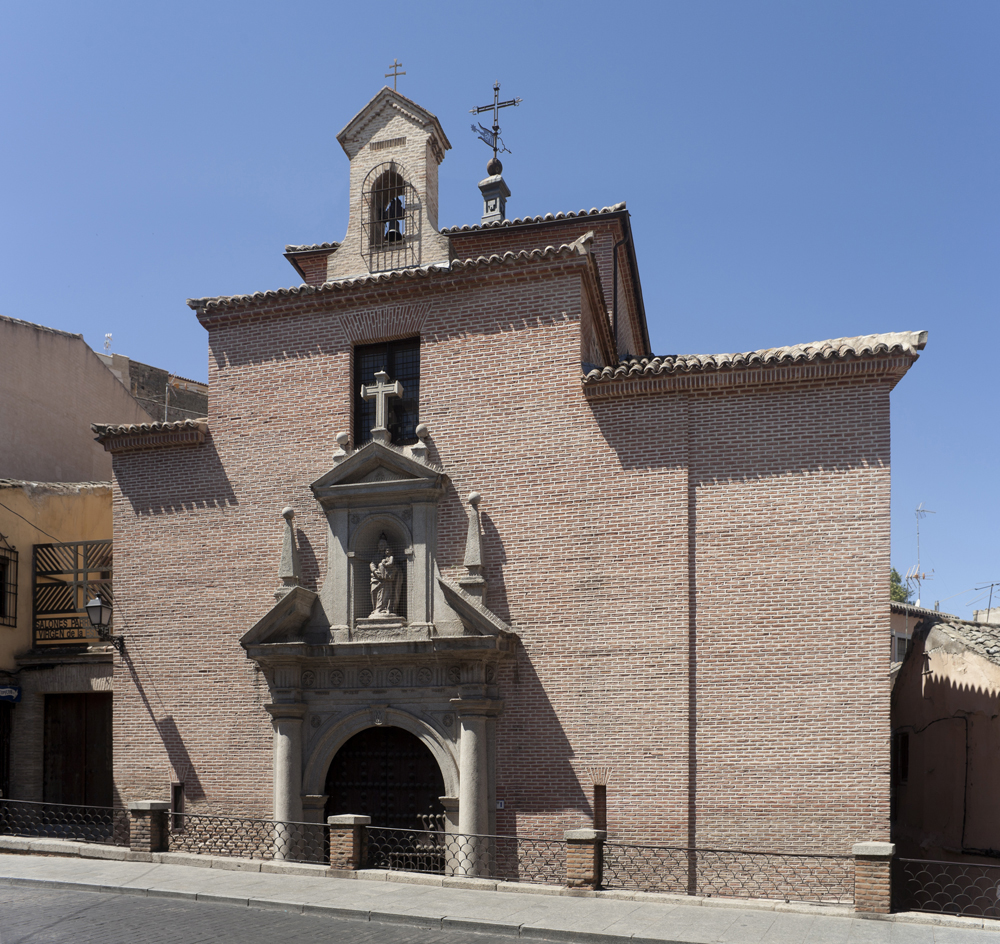
Ermita de Nuestra Señora de la Estrella

The Ermita de Nuestra Señora de la Estrella is a Baroque hermitage in the city of Toledo (Castile-La Mancha, Spain) was founded by the co-fraternity of hortelanos, which had its headquarters in the neighboring church of Santiago del Arrabal.

Its construction was completed in the 14th century, according to traces of Juan Bautista Monegro, at that time main master of the cathedral.

It has paintings and altars with Solomonic columns from the 18th Century.
