= Széchenyi Square =

Square in Pécs, Hungary

Coordinates: 46°04′34″N 18°13′42″E

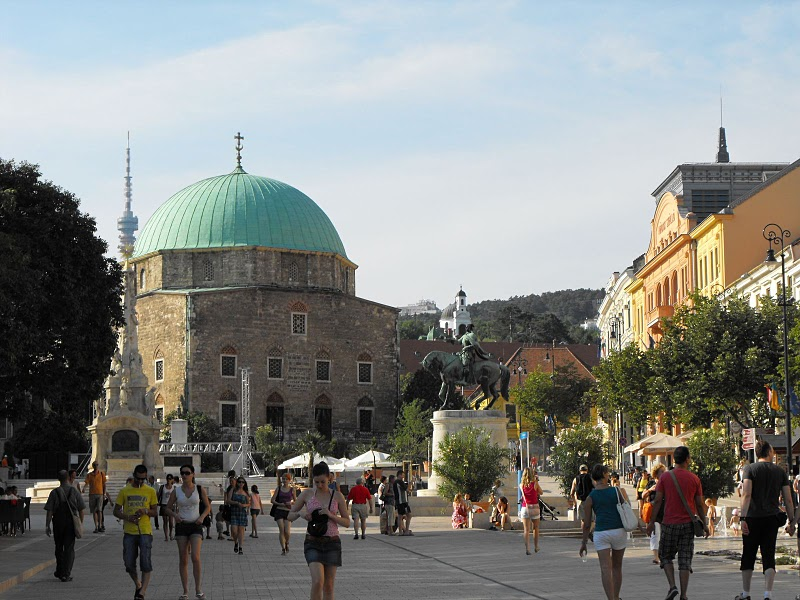
Széchenyi Square, after the 2010 renovation.

Széchenyi Square (Hungarian: Széchenyi tér) is the main square in the historical centre of Pécs, Hungary. In the Middle Ages it served as the market place of the town with the city hall and the parish church. Before being named after Széchenyi in 1864, it had had several other names including Fórum, Városi piacz, and Főtér. The square is one of the central squares of Pécs, full of monuments, mounting gradually northward. Twelve streets lead into the square spoke-wise. Its main attractions are the Mosque of Pasha Qasim, the City Hall, the County Hall, the Nádor hotel, the Zsolnay well, the Fatebenefratelli Church, the Trinity statue and the brass statue of János Hunyadi on horse back. The surface of the square was rebuilt within the scope of the project Pécs2010 European Cultural Capital. Within the annual Pécs days festival, the festival of wine and grape is held on the square. It is celebrated fairs and vintage carnivals wine tasting of the famous wine regions of Pécs and Villány. The Christmas tree of the town is set on Széchenyi Square.

== Location ==
The square is located in the heart of the old town of Pécs, on the southern side of the Mecsek mountain. Twelve streets run into the square, starting from the south clockwise: Irgalmasok street, Jókai square, Ferencesek street, Ciszterci alley, Janus Pannonius street, Szepessy Ignác street, Hunyadi János street, Megye street, Mária street, Király street, Perczel Miklós street and Munkácsy Mihály street.

== The mosque and other monuments ==
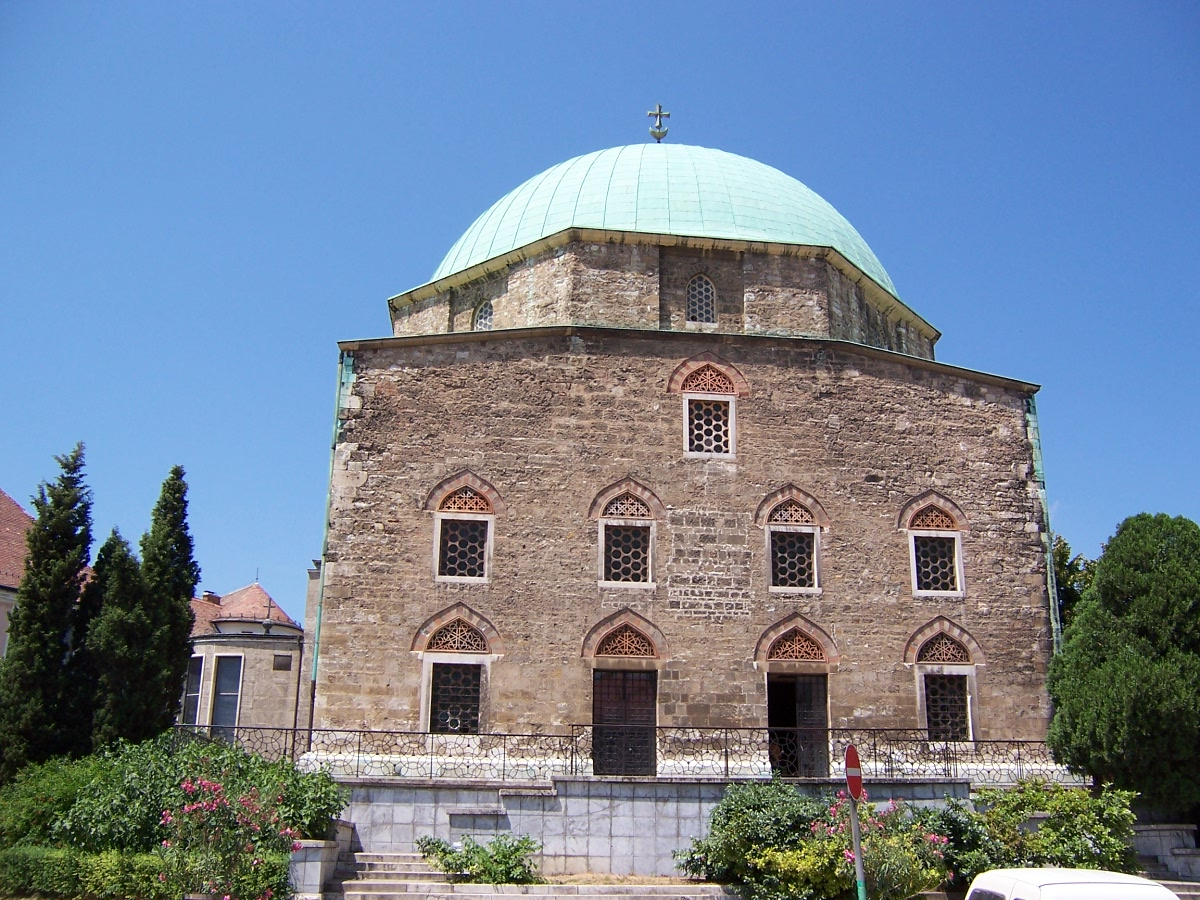
Mosque of pasha Qasim the Victorious.

The central building of Széchenyi square is the Mosque of pasha Qasim the Victorious, one of the symbols of Pécs.

In the Middle Ages, the Gothic Saint Bertalan parish church stood in the middle of the city centre. After the city was taken over by the Turks the mosque of pasha Qasim was built from the rocks of Saint Bertalan. There existed a minaret next to the mosque the top of which was brought down in 1753. Its lower part was also demolished in 1766 and only its basement remained intact. In the inner wall, by the current main entrance, there is a mihrab that indicates the qibla; that is, the direction of the Kaaba in Mecca. The building took its current form during the reconstruction in 1939. Saint Bertalan bell is next to the mosque.

The statue of János Hunyadi on horse back, made by sculptor Pál Pátzy, is set on a simple stone pedestal and was inaugurated on the 12 August 1956, the 500th anniversary of the death of János Hunyadi.

The Trinity statue in the middle of the square reached completion in 1714 to commemorate the secession of an earlier plague. The once baroque statue was so much ruined by the end of the 19th century that the city had to make a new one made – done by György Kiss – which was inaugurated in 1908.

== Southern part ==
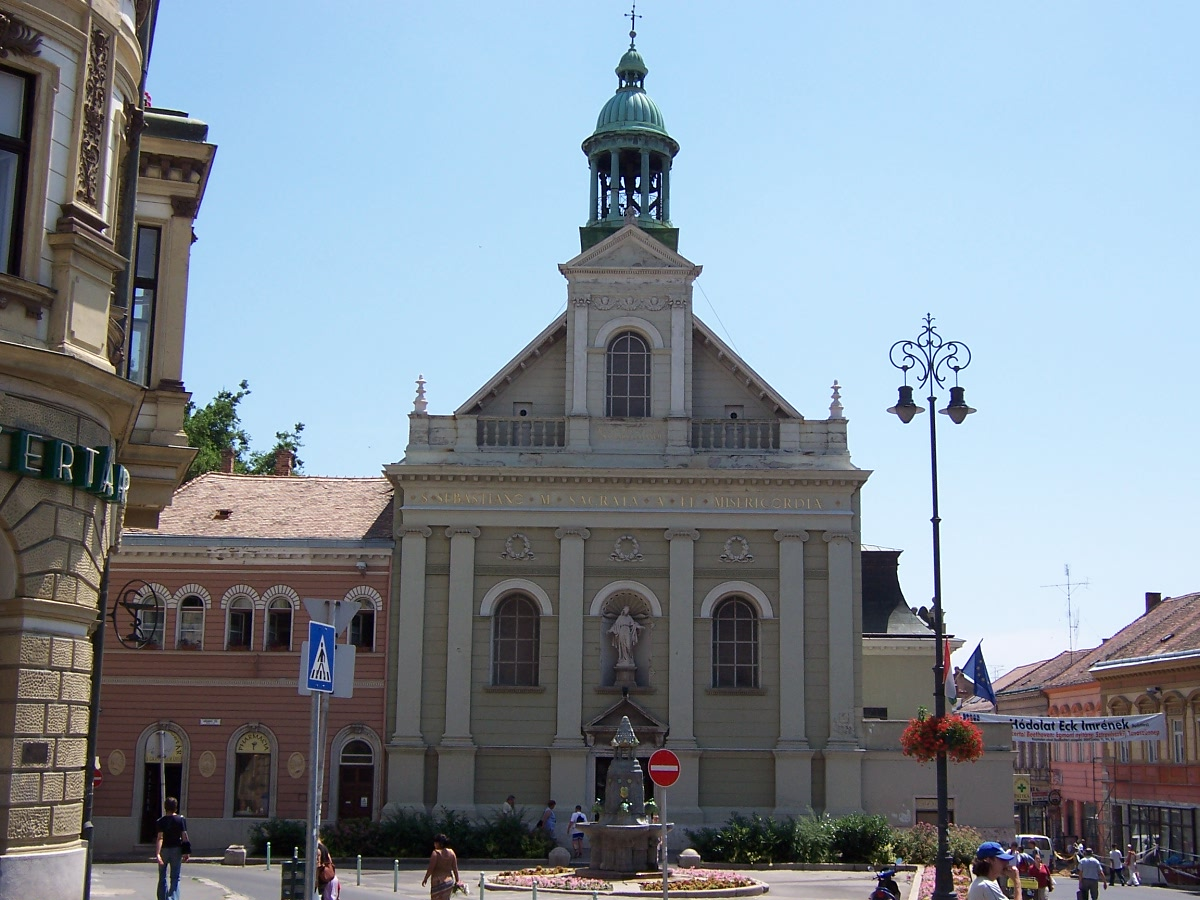
Church with Zsolnay well in front.

The eosin well of Zsolnay, designed by Andor Pilch, is situated on the southern part of the square. tér. On the four side of the four-meter-high (13 ft) well water gurgles through heads of oxen into an arc shaped basin. The well, donated by Miklós Zsolnay is decorated by the coats of arms of the city and the family.

The Fatebenefratelli Church was built between 1727 and 1731. Its facade is eclectic. The first floor is decorated by through-gutter. The chamber with arc ending on the front has a Marie statue made by György Kis. The interior of the church was rebuilt in 1908. Its inlaid, wooden altars have exceptional artistic value. The baroque Italian main altar painting depicts the martyrdom of Saint Sebastian. The frescos were painted by Endre Graits in 1908. The relief of Istenes Szent János, founder of Fatebenefratelli order was made by Ede Mayer sculptor. Its organ was fabricated in Anster's workshop. On the western side of the church the chapel is rectangular. On the walls several emblazoned gravestones with few centimetre deep inscriptions allude to a vault under the church; however the location of its entrance is unknown.

== Western part ==
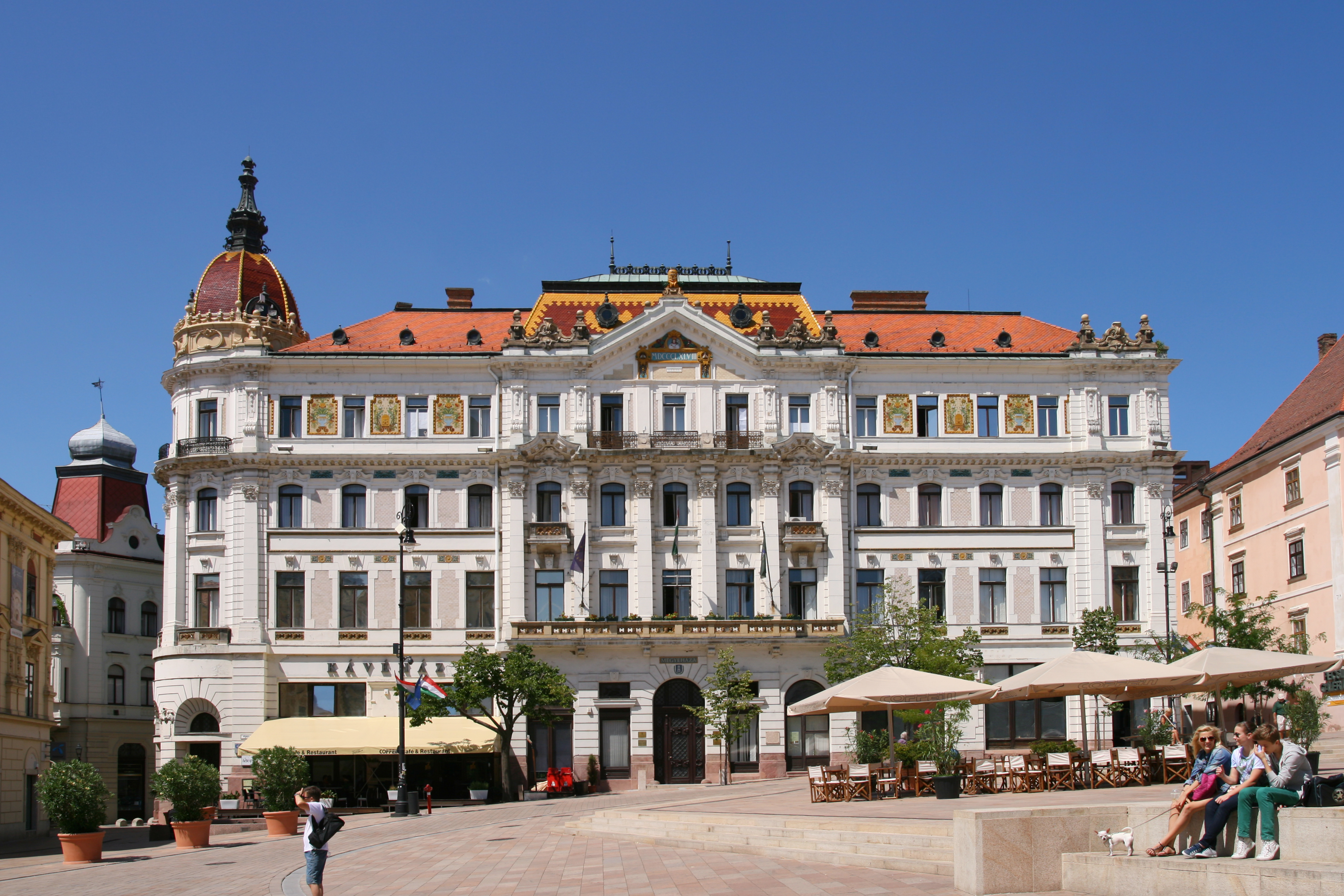
Baranya County Hall

The building of the county hall was built in 1897. Its pedestals are made from red sandstone of the nearby Kővágószőlős. Its facade looking to the square is much more decorated than other buildings on the square. Its art pottery decors were made in Zsolnay factory. The roof of the building burnt down in 1954 and the following one received a simpler design without the previous dome. Lajos Nagy Gymnasium is located to the north from the county hall building. The plaza front of the two-story block, looking on three streets was built between 1716 and 1726 by the Jesuits using the thumb stones of the Turkish cemetery on Kórház square. Hungarian poet Ferenc Faludi taught in this building in the years between 1723 and 1728. The building was the home of an art academy from 1785 to 1802. Several times it functioned as a hospital and even as a barrack-room between 1852 and 1863. It was owned by the Cistercians from the beginning of the 20th century until the order ended. The side was built in 1863 and the northern side between 1935 and 1936. Frescos in the stairway depict the foundation and structure of the first university of Pécs (the works of Ernő Gebauer). There was an open public bath in its court decorated by arcades. The white marble bust of Leonardo da Vinci stands in a small park in front of the northern corner of the building. (George Baksa Soós, 1958).

== Northern part ==
The northern part of the square is partly made up by one of the buildings of Janus Pannonius Museum. Its main front has copf style and its side has classic style. There are two beautiful iron mashed gate from the 19th century in its doorway. Next to the museum is the Eizer House, built in 1840 and partly demolished and rebuilt in 1950. Adjacent to this stands the Taizs House on the facade of which there is a richly decorated corner balcony.

== Eastern part ==
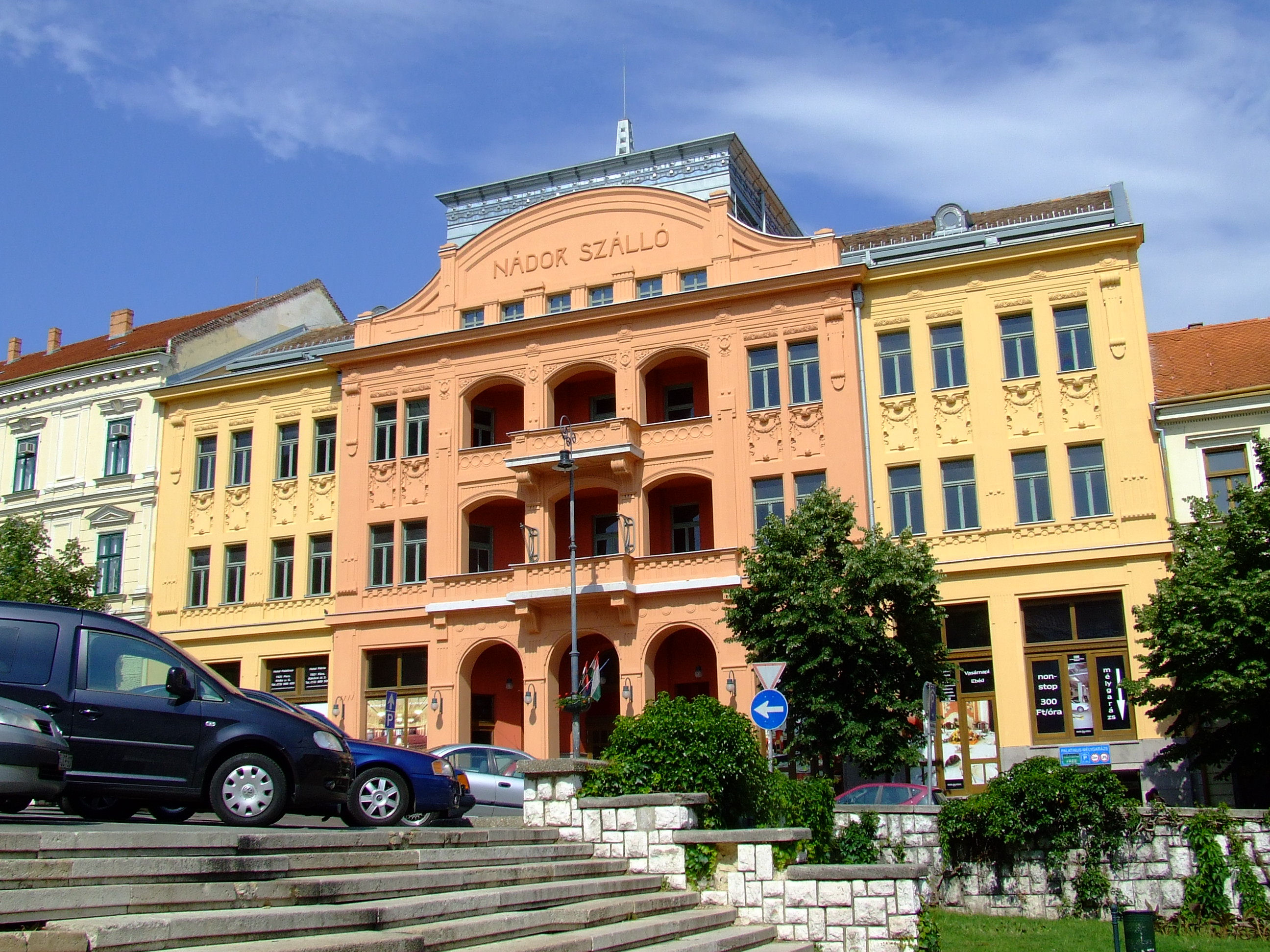
The reconstructed facade of Hotel Nádor.

The first city hall was built after the Ottoman occupation of Hungary in 1710, and the second one between 1831 and 1832. It received its current form during the reconstruction in 1907 after the plans of Antal Lang with baroque elements on the front. On the corners the roofs are mansard, and the part on Király Street is adorned by a gigantic tower.

Nador hotel was built in 1846 which was demolished in 1902 to build a larger one in its place. By the end of the 1980s the facade of the hotel building was seriously damaged. After being closed for over fifteen years its facade was reconstructed in 2005 and an underground parking place was constructed. A gallery was opened in the building in 2009 but the hotel has not opened yet (2010.05.01.)

== Saint Bertalan Church ==
In July 2009, archaeologists found new evidences of the Saint Bertalan church from the age of Árpád from the stones of which was later built the mosque of pasha Qasim the Victorious. According to researcher András Kikindai with these foundings 80% of the Saint Bertalan Church and buildings related to it are discovered.

== Gallery ==
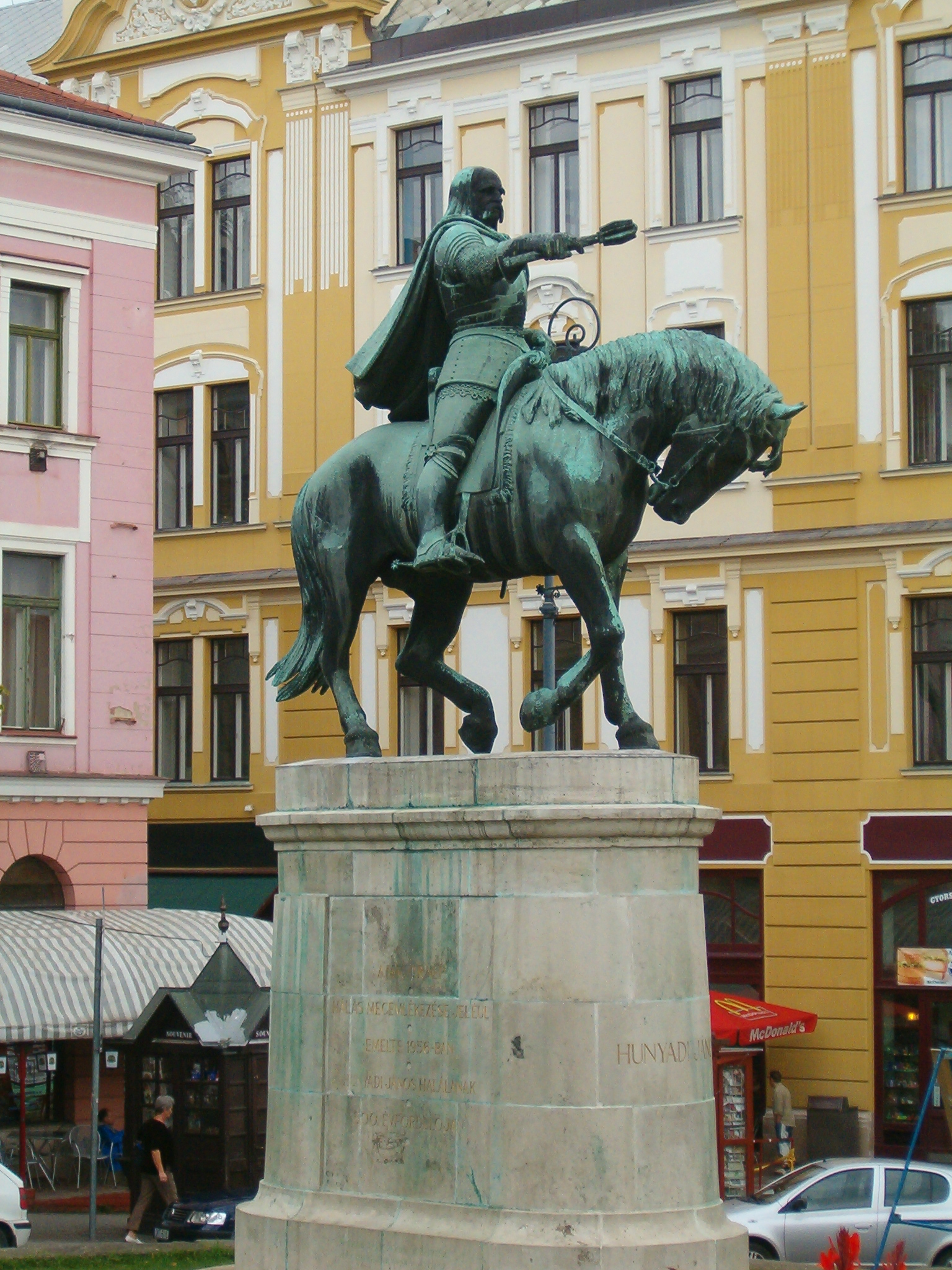
The stature of János Hunyadi serves as a meeting place for locals.

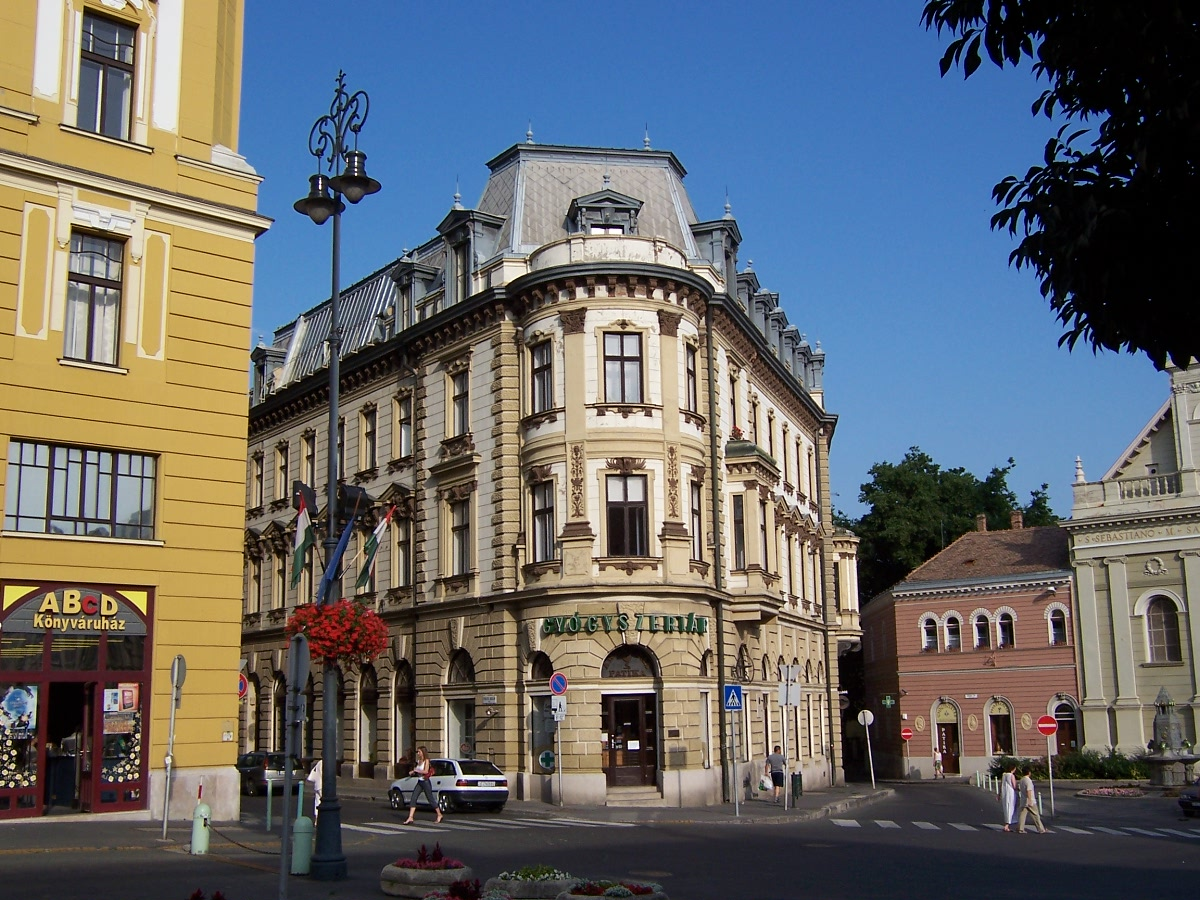
The corner of Mór Percel street and Mihály Munkácsy street.

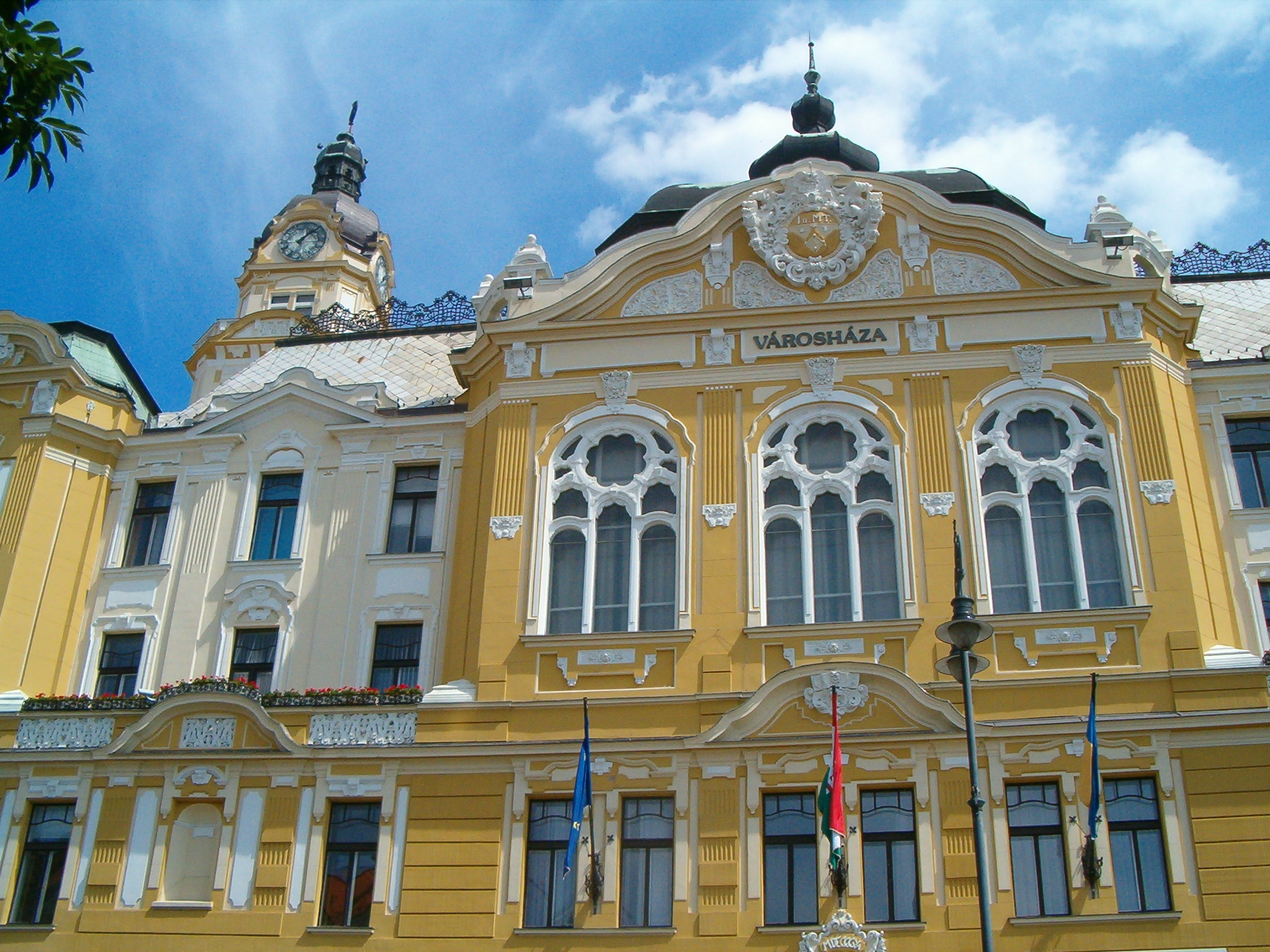
The building of the city hall.

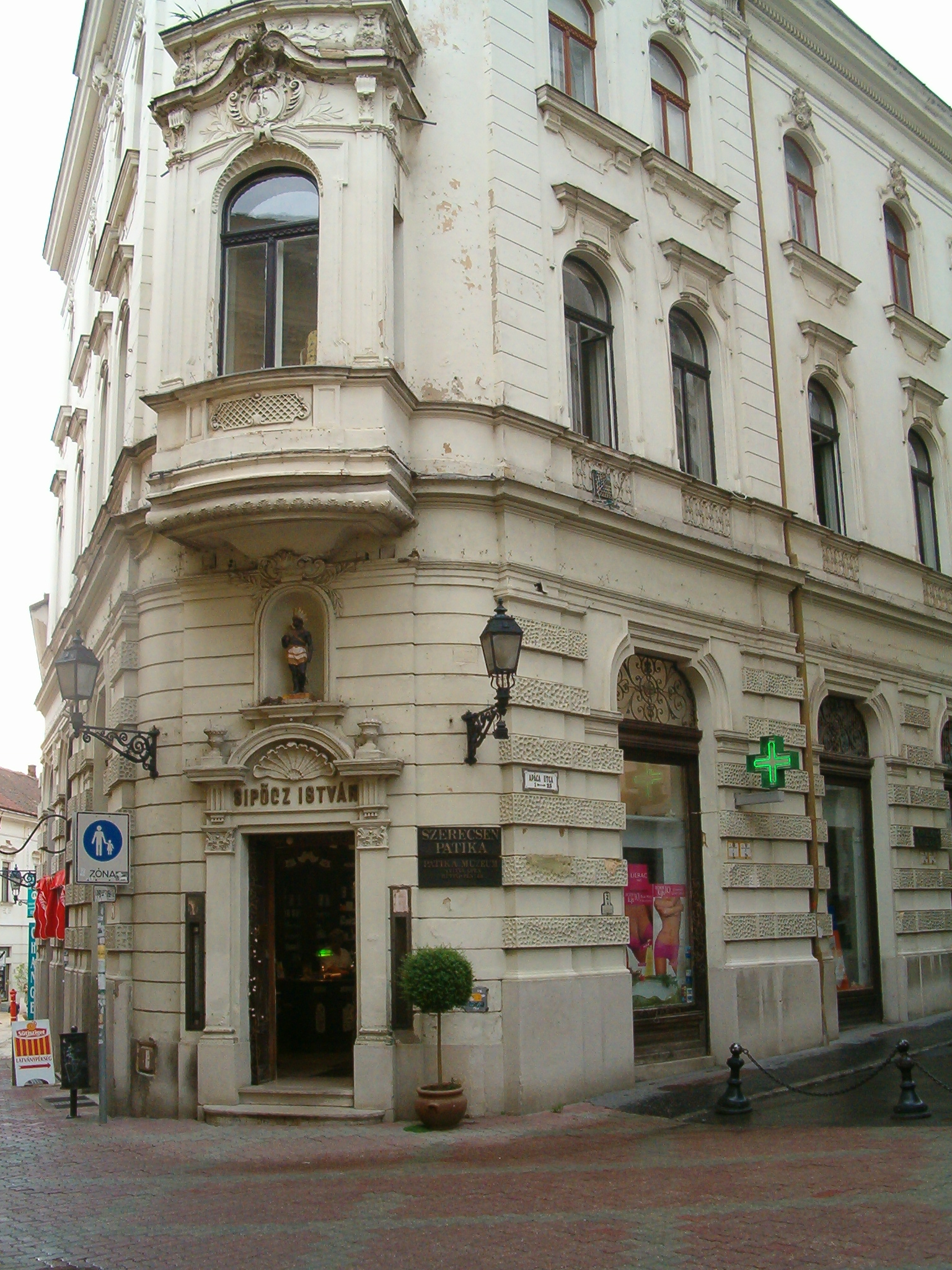
The corner building of Szerecsen pharmacy.

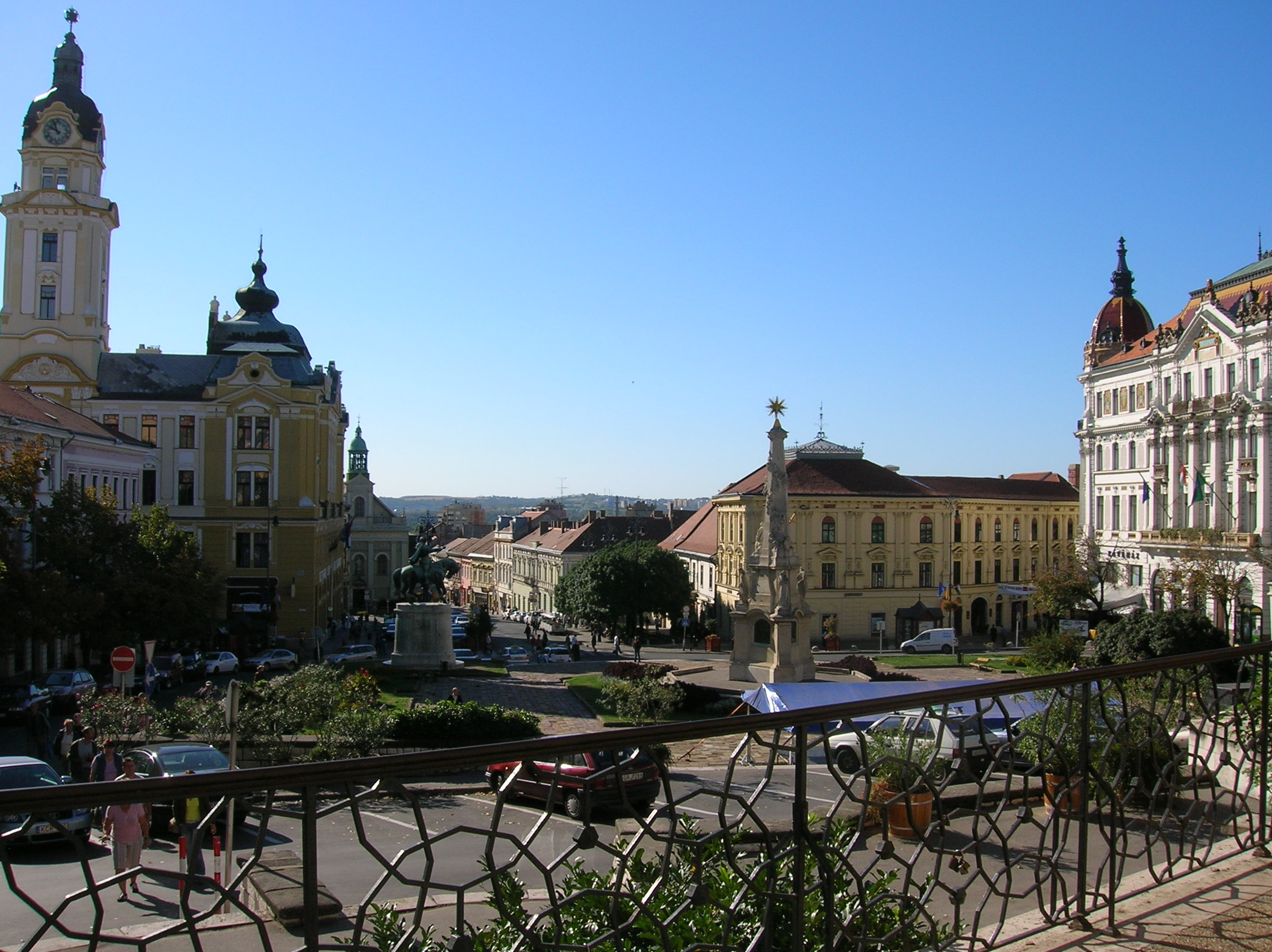
The square from the mosque.

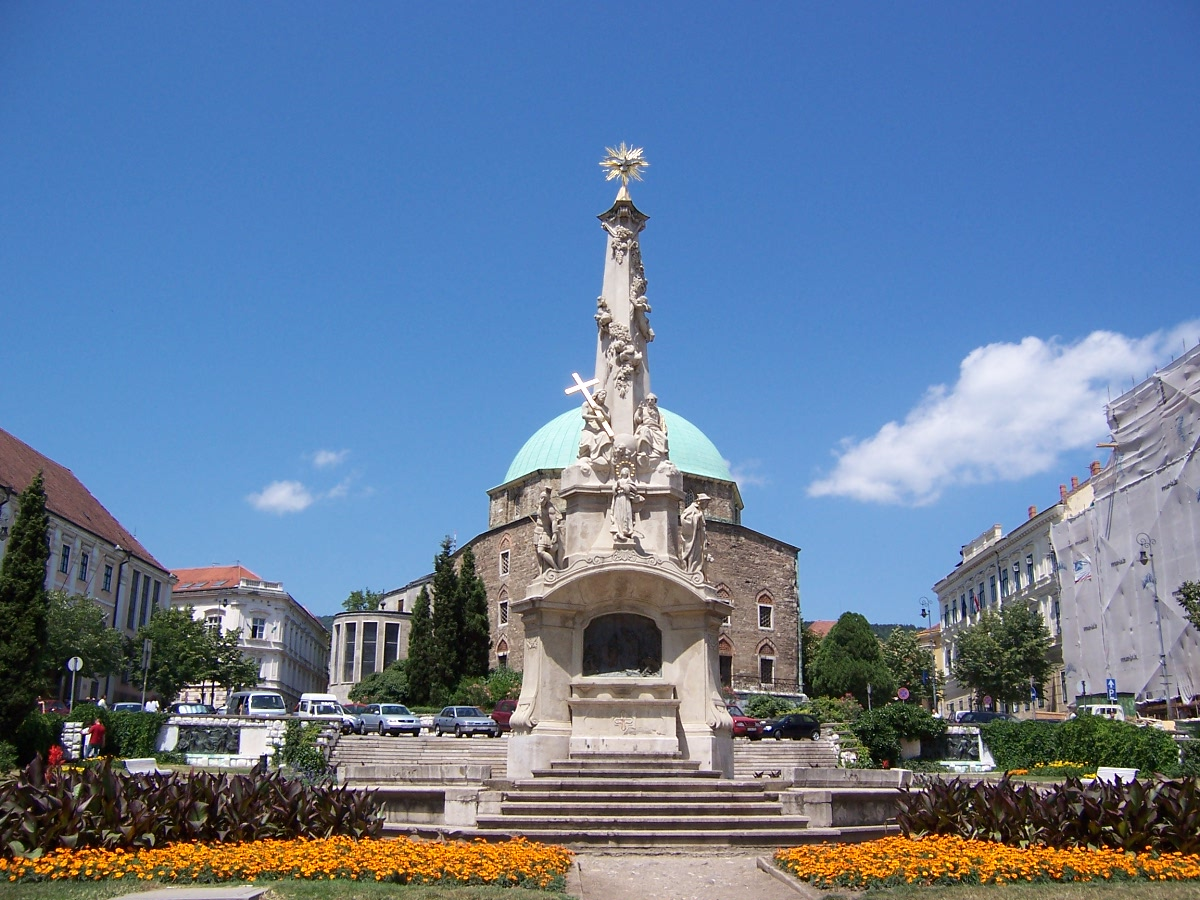
The statue of Trinity.

== Resources ==
- Kolta János, Pécs, Panoráma, 1972
- Official site of the city of Pécs.
