= Baranya County Hall =

- Pécs Megyeháza
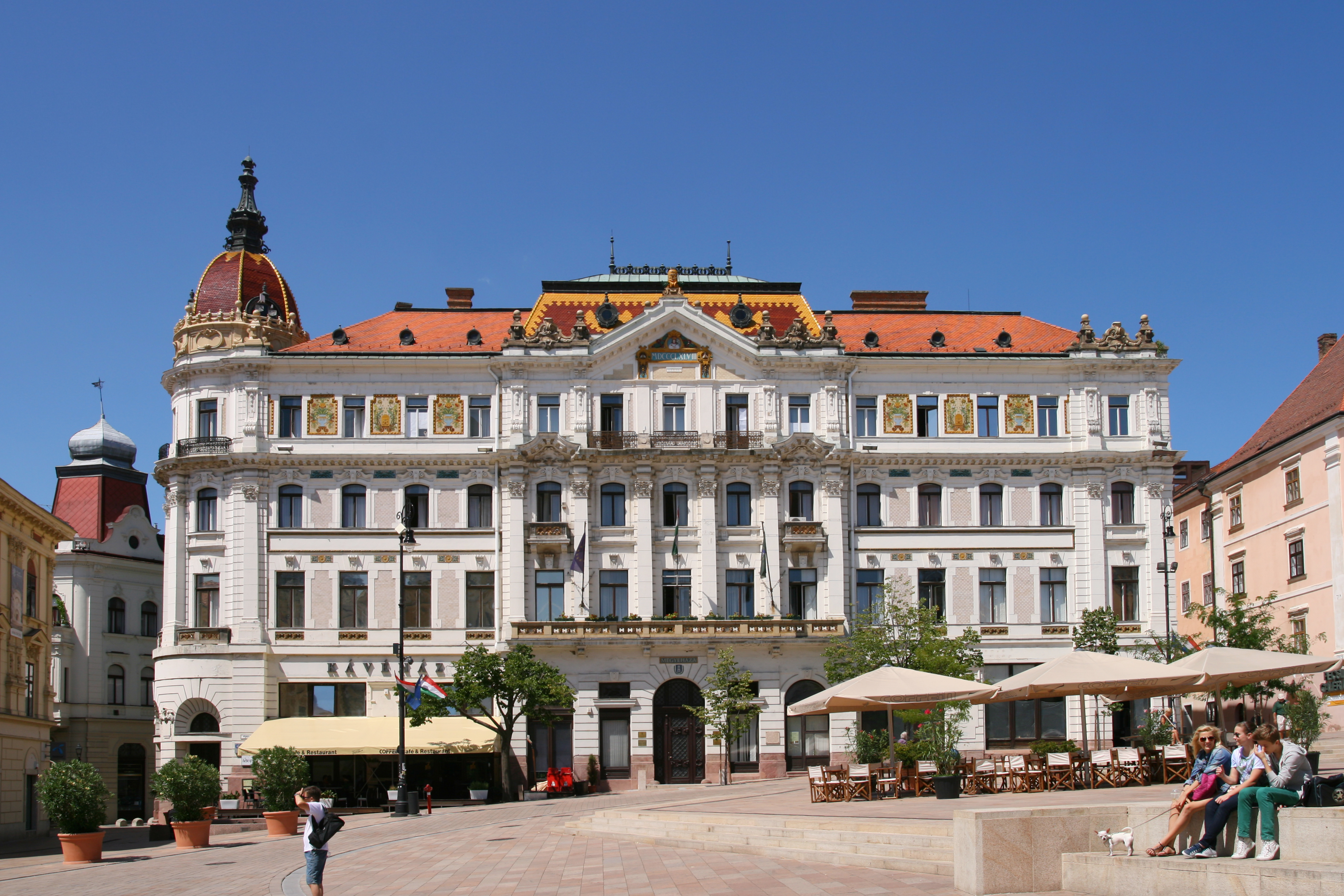
- Interactive map of the Baranya County Hall area

General information
- Architectural style: eclecticism
- Location: Pécs, Hungary
- Coordinates: 46°04′34″N 18°13′39″E
- Current tenants: Baranya County
- Construction started: 1897

The Baranya County Hall (Hungarian: Pécs Megyeháza) is a representative historical building in Pécs, Hungary. Located at the main Széchenyi Square the building serves at the seat of modern day Baranya County. The building was constructed in 1897. In 1954, a portion of the building was destroyed by fire, but it was later rebuilt with a new, simpler roof design.

== History ==
The building was erected on two plots that were once home to the Czyndery House and Cséby House. During his visit to Pécs in 1770, Emperor Joseph II stayed in the Czyndery House. In 1895, the Pécs-Baranya Central Savings Bank acquired the site and constructed its headquarters. The bees and beehives adorning the façade symbolize this financial institution. During the socialist era, the building housed the local council, and following the political transition, it became the seat of the county.

== See also ==
- Széchenyi Square
