= St. Nicholas Church, Kavala =

Church in Kavala, Greece

Saint Nicholas' Church
- Ιερός Ναός Αγίου Νικολάου
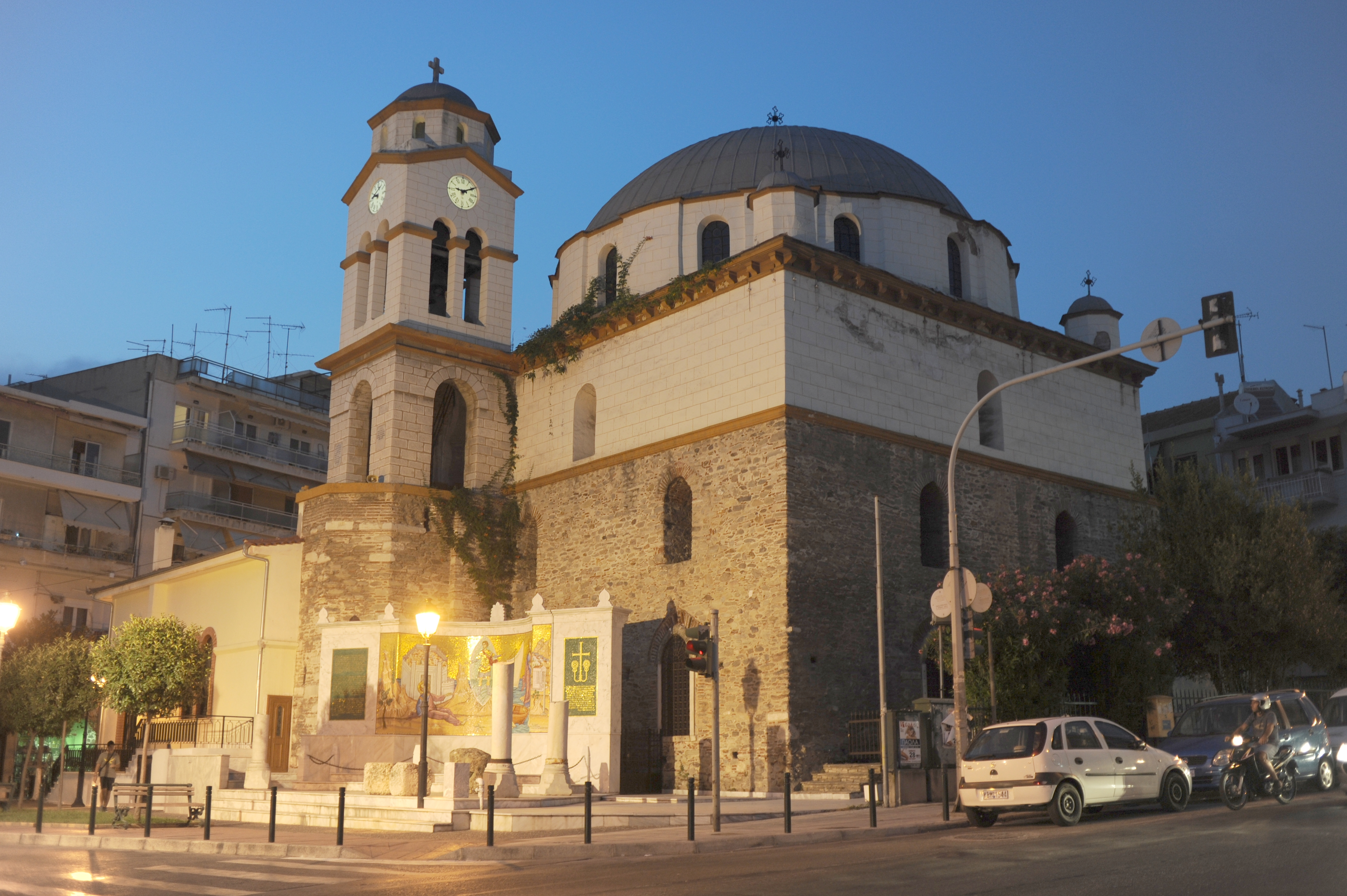
- The church in 2012

- Location of the church in Greece
- Saint Nicholas' Church
- 40°56′10″N 24°24′48″E
- Location: Kavala, Eastern Macedonia and Thrace
- Country: Greece
- Language: Greek
- Denomination: Greek Orthodox
- Previous denomination: Islam (1530–1920s)

History
- Former name(s): Ibrahim Pasha Mosque (Turkish: İbrahim Paşa Camii)
- Status: Mosque (1530–1920s); Church (since 1920s– )
- Dedication: Saint Nicholas

Architecture
- Functional status: Active
- Architectural type: Mosque (1530); Church (1920s)
- Style: Ottoman
- Completed: 1530

Specifications
- Materials: Brick; stone

Administration
- Metropolis: Philippi, Neapolis and Thasos

The Church of Saint Nicholas (Greek: Ιερός Ναός Αγίου Νικολάου) is a Greek Orthodox church in the town of Kavala, in the Eastern Macedonia and Thrace region of Greece. It was built during Ottoman period as a mosque, called the Ibrahim Pasha Mosque (Turkish: İbrahim Paşa Camii), before it was converted into a church in modern times.

== History ==
The building was erected in 1530 during the Ottoman rule of Macedonia as an Islamic mosque, perhaps on the site of a pre-existing Christian church, by Ibrahim Pasha, vizier to Sultan Suleiman the Magnificent, and it was the largest mosque in Kavala.

In the 1920s the mosque was converted into a church for Christian worship, dedicated to Saint Nicholas; the bell-tower was built upon the base of the destroyed minaret. On the eastern side of the church there is a mural depicting the arrival of Apostle Paul in the port.

== Gallery ==
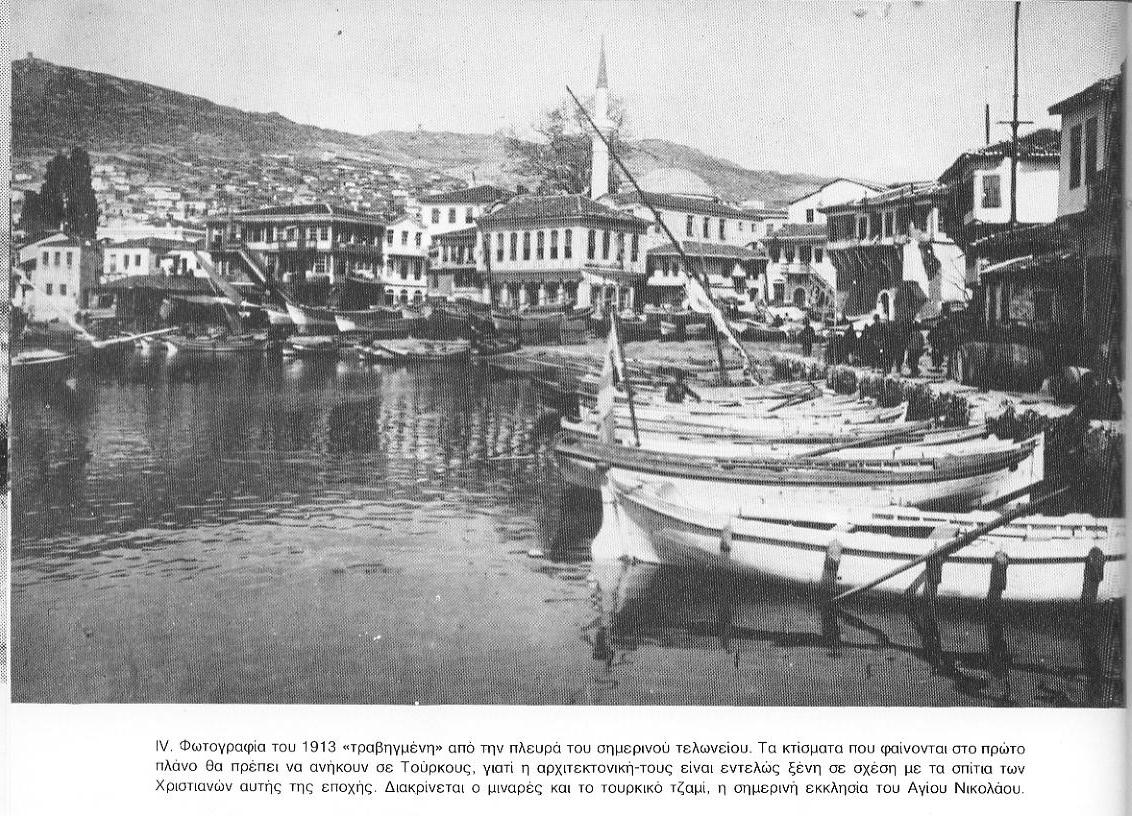
Panoramic view of Kavala in 1913 from the customs house

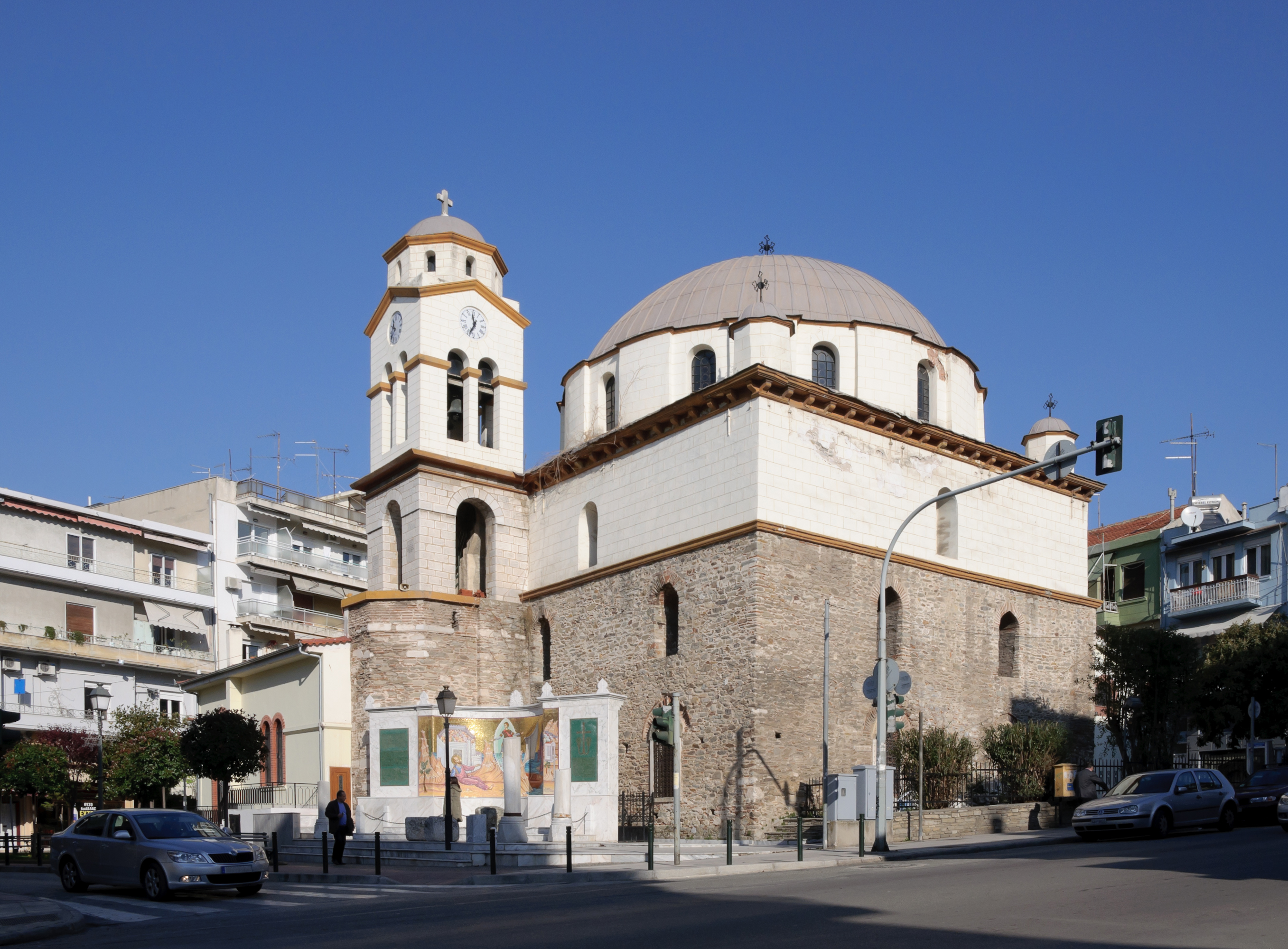
The church with the mural

== See also ==
- Islam in Greece
- List of former mosques in Greece
- Conversion of mosques into non-Islamic places of worship
- Ottoman Greece
