= St. Paraskeva Church, Giannitsa =

Church in Giannitsa, Greece

St. Paraskeva Church
- Ιερός Ναός Αγίας Παρασκευής
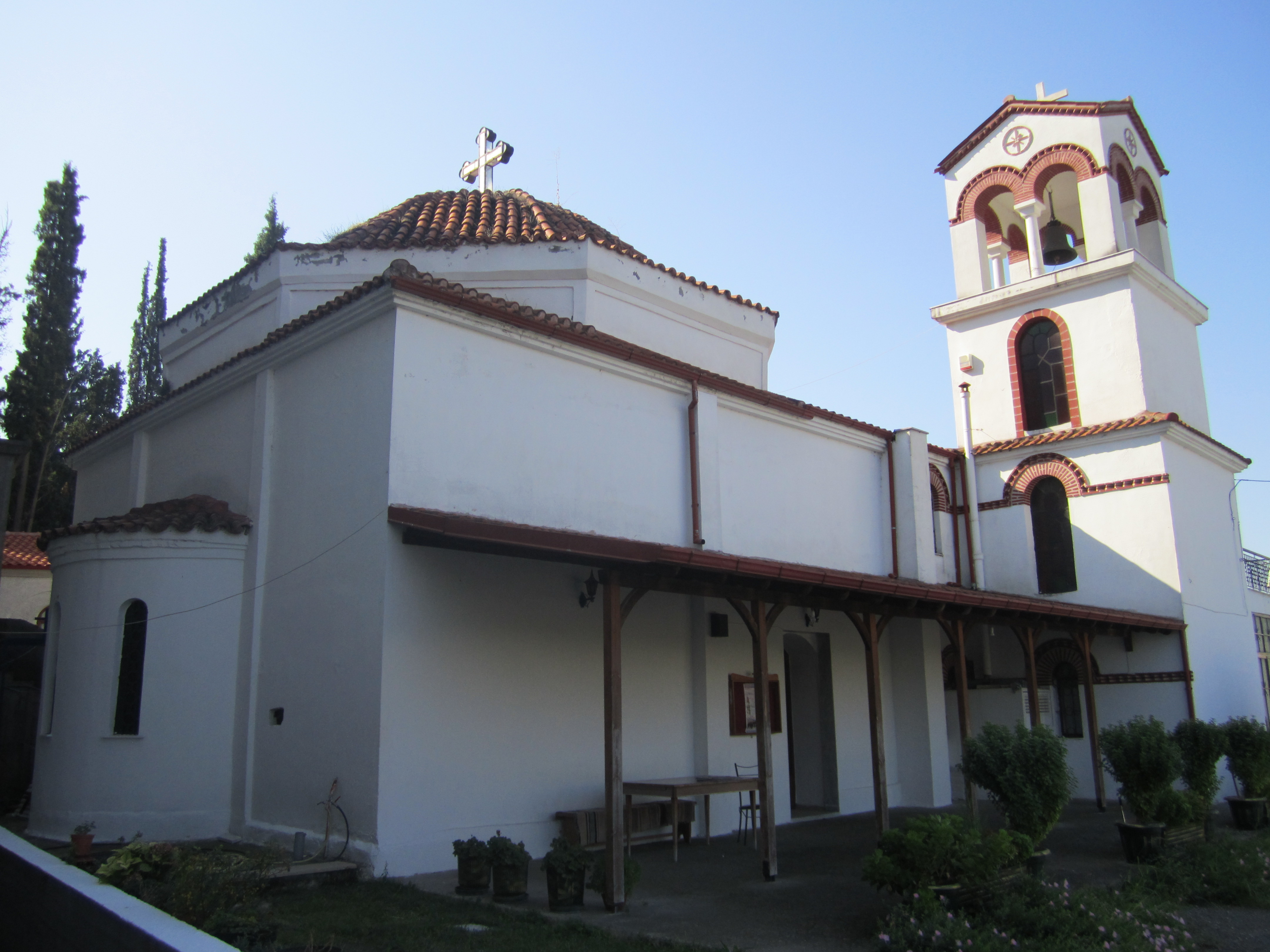
- The church in 2011

- Location of the church in Greece
- St. Paraskeva Church
- 40°47′08″N 22°24′51″E
- Location: Giannitsa, Central Macedonia
- Country: Greece
- Language: Greek
- Denomination: Greek Orthodox
- Previous denomination: Islam (15th century–c. 1910s)

History
- Former name(s): Yakup Bey Mosque (Turkish: Yakup Bey Camii)
- Status: Mosque (15th century–c. 1910s); Church (1948–1951); Monastery (1951–1995); Parish church (since 1995– )
- Dedication: Paraskeva of the Balkans

Architecture
- Functional status: Active
- Architectural type: Mosque (15th century); Church (1948)
- Style: Ottoman
- Completed: 15th century (as a mosque); 1948 (as a church)

Specifications
- Materials: Stone

Administration
- Metropolis: Metropolis of Edessa, Pella and Almopia

The St. Paraskeva Church (Greek: Ιερός Ναός Αγίας Παρασκευής) is a Greek Orthodox church in the town of Giannitsa, in the Central Macedonia region of northern Greece, dedicated to Saint Paraskeva of the Balkans, and belonging to the archdiocese of Edessa, Pella and Almopia. Built as a mosque during the Ottoman era, the building was converted into a church following the incorporation of Giannitsa and the rest of Greek Macedonia into Greece in the early twentieth century.

== History ==
The building was originally built as a Muslim mosque built in the fifteenth century, probably by one of the descendants of Gazi Evrenos, the founder of Giannitsa, and described by Ottoman traveller and explorer Evliya Çelebi as a mosque made of large stones. Its name during the years it functioned as a mosque was Yakup Bey Mosque (Turkish: Yakup Bey Camii). The older complex included a tekke as well.

As a result of the Macedonian Struggle and following the Balkan Wars, Giannitsa become part of Greek Macedonia from the 1910s. In 1947–1948, Archimandrite Nicander Papaioannou, the owner of the plot and the building, converted the mosque into a church. In 1951, he donated the church and the entire plot to the Metropolitanate of Edessa and Pella. The church then functioned as a monastery for about forty years with the appropriate utility rooms and lodgings. Since October 1995, the building has served as a parish church, with an adjacent cemetery.

Eventually a larger church was built next to this one.

The church was declared a historical monument on 13 June 1990.

== Architecture ==
The original building is the posterior part of today's church – an octagonal building, typical of the fifteenth century mausoleums, with a 3.5-metre-long (11 ft) wall and a 7-metre-tall (23 ft) dome. Later when it served as a monastery, several architectural changes were made such as a bell tower being added to it on the site of the destroyed minaret, though with the exception of the addition of the bell tower and the sanctuary, no extreme changes took place.

Interior decoration of the church was completed by the painters, Karlas, Viron, and Avramidis. The iconography are the works of monks from the Holy Spirit Monastery in Oropos.

== See also ==
- Eastern Orthodoxy in Greece
- Islam in Greece
- List of cathedrals in Greece
- List of former mosques in Greece
- Ottoman Greece

== Bibliography ==
- Ameen, Ahmed (2017). Islamic architecture in Greece: Mosques. Alexandria: Center for Islamic Civilization studies, Bibliotheca Alexandrina.
- Stavridopoulos, Ioannis (2015). Μνημεία του άλλου: η διαχείριση της οθωμανικής πολιτιστική κληρονομιάς της Μακεδονίας από το 1912 έως σήμερα [Other People's Monuments: the Management of the Ottoman Cultural Heritage of Macedonia from 1912 to the present] (Thesis) (in Greek). Ioannina: University of Ioannina.
