= Mezquita-Iglesia de El Salvador, Toledo =

Church in Toledo, Spain

Coordinates: 39.8566°N 4.0267°W

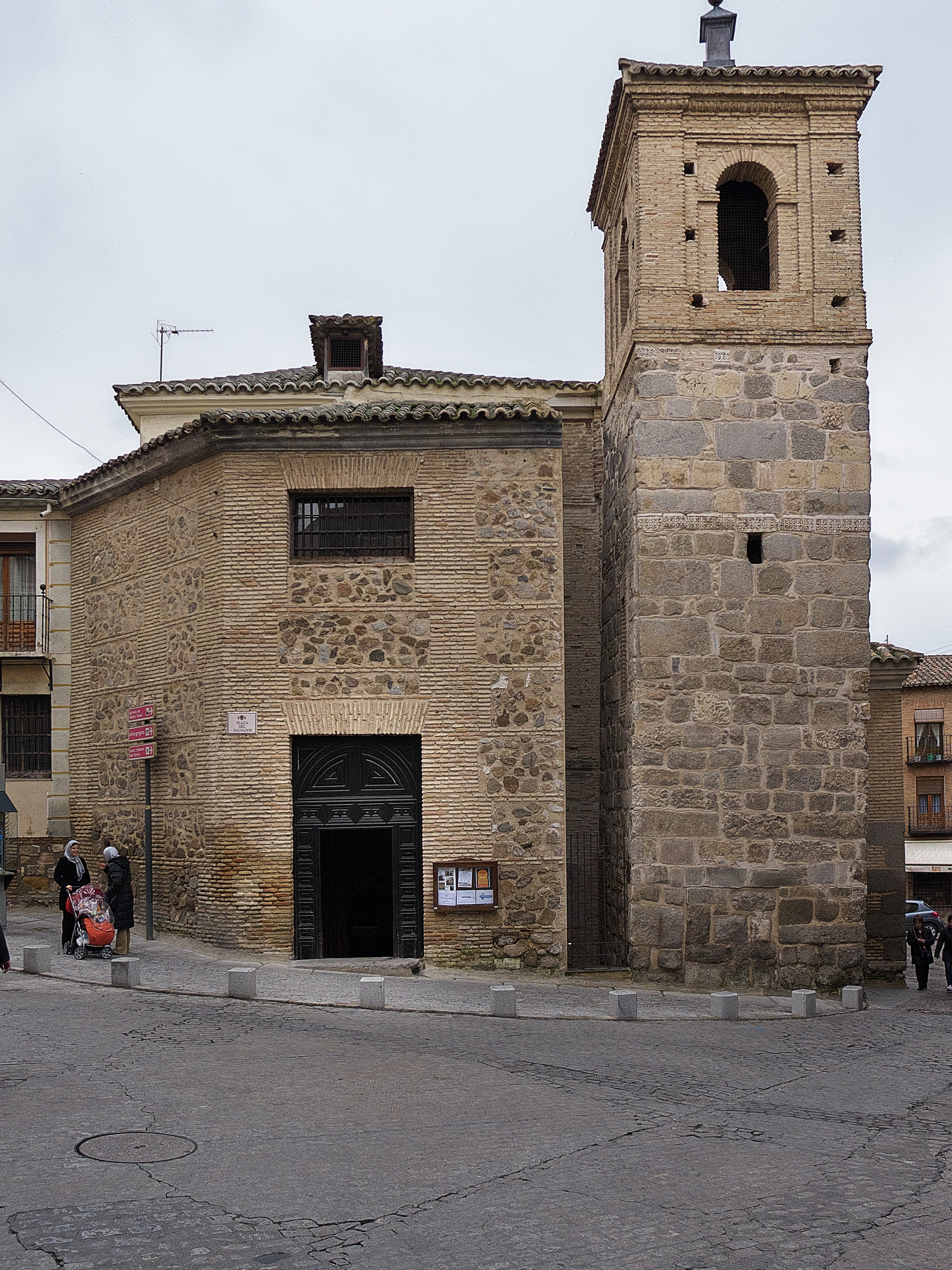
Facade

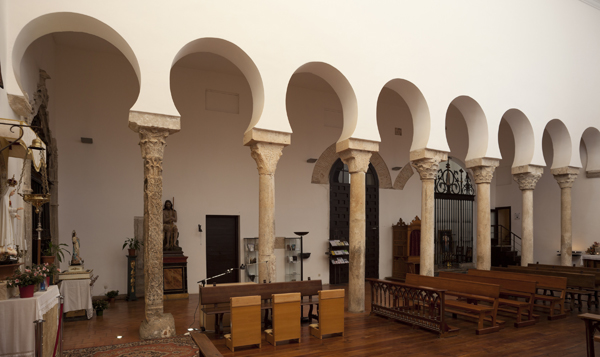
The arcade of the former mosque blended in the church; its horseshoe arches rest on 6 reused Roman capitals and one Visigothic pilaster

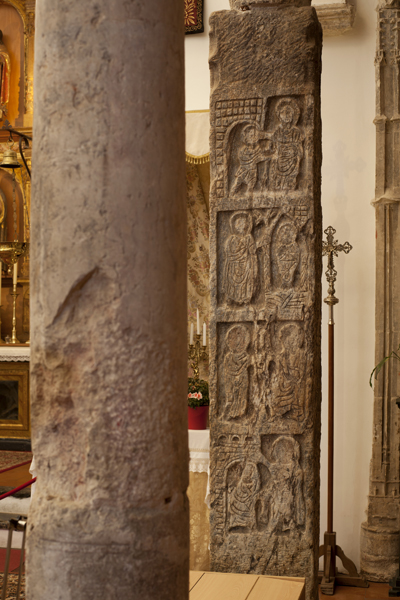
The Visigothic decorative reliefs. The faces were scraped by the Muslims.

The Iglesia de El Salvador is a church in Toledo, Spain completed in 1159.

Although the church is small, it is an exceptional building, because it was the site of 4 successive constructions, one on other and so on. It is a 12th-century church built on an 11th-century Taifa mosque, which was an expansion of a 9th-century Umayyad mosque and in turn on a Visigothic religious building.

== History ==
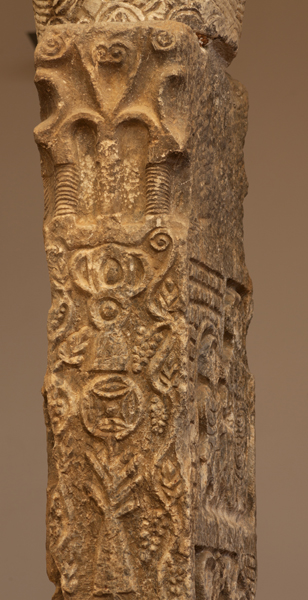
A Visighotic relief

The Iglesia de El Salvador is located in the city of Toledo, near the Churches of Santo Tomé and Convento de Santa Úrsula. It is one of the churches mentioned in the Lazarillo de Tormes, and here Joanna of Castile ("the Mad") and the dramatist Francisco de Rojas Zorrilla were baptized.

The current church is built on the mosque, so it is oriented southeast in direction toward Mecca. For which construction, different elements of the previous Visigothic building were reused, because of that a horseshoe arcade supported on Visigothic pilasters has been preserved with sculpted decoration of figurative themes, unusual in this type of remains. The Pilaster of El Salvador, shows in one of its faces various Visigothic miraculous scenes from the life of Jesus: the Cure of the Blind, the Resurrection of Lazarus, the Samaritan and the Hemorroísa, as well as other themes of eucharistic hue that alluding to Christ as the salvation. Its crude treatment shows the abandonment in which the work had fallen on the stone.

Although it conserves the shape of the minaret, that carries incrustations of borders, in 1159 it made several Christian modifications, and the construction in the end-15th century of the Gothic chapel of Santa Catalina. The tower corresponds to the minaret of the mosque, with a Baroque brick addition at the body of the bells.

It is dedicated to St. Savior. The church suffered a fire in the 15th century, which forced an important restoration. Álvarez de Toledo was commissioned to the restoration and he added new chapels highlighting the chapel of Santa Catalina.

== Bibliography ==
- Miguel Gomez García de la Marin; Julián García Sánchez de Pedro (2005). "The ornamentation of the mosque of El Salvador". Tulaytula: Magazine of the Association of Friends of Islamic Toledo (12): 71–91. ISSN 1575-653X.
