= Downtown Candlemas Church of the Blessed Virgin Mary =

- Belvárosi Gyertyaszentelő Boldogasszony-templom
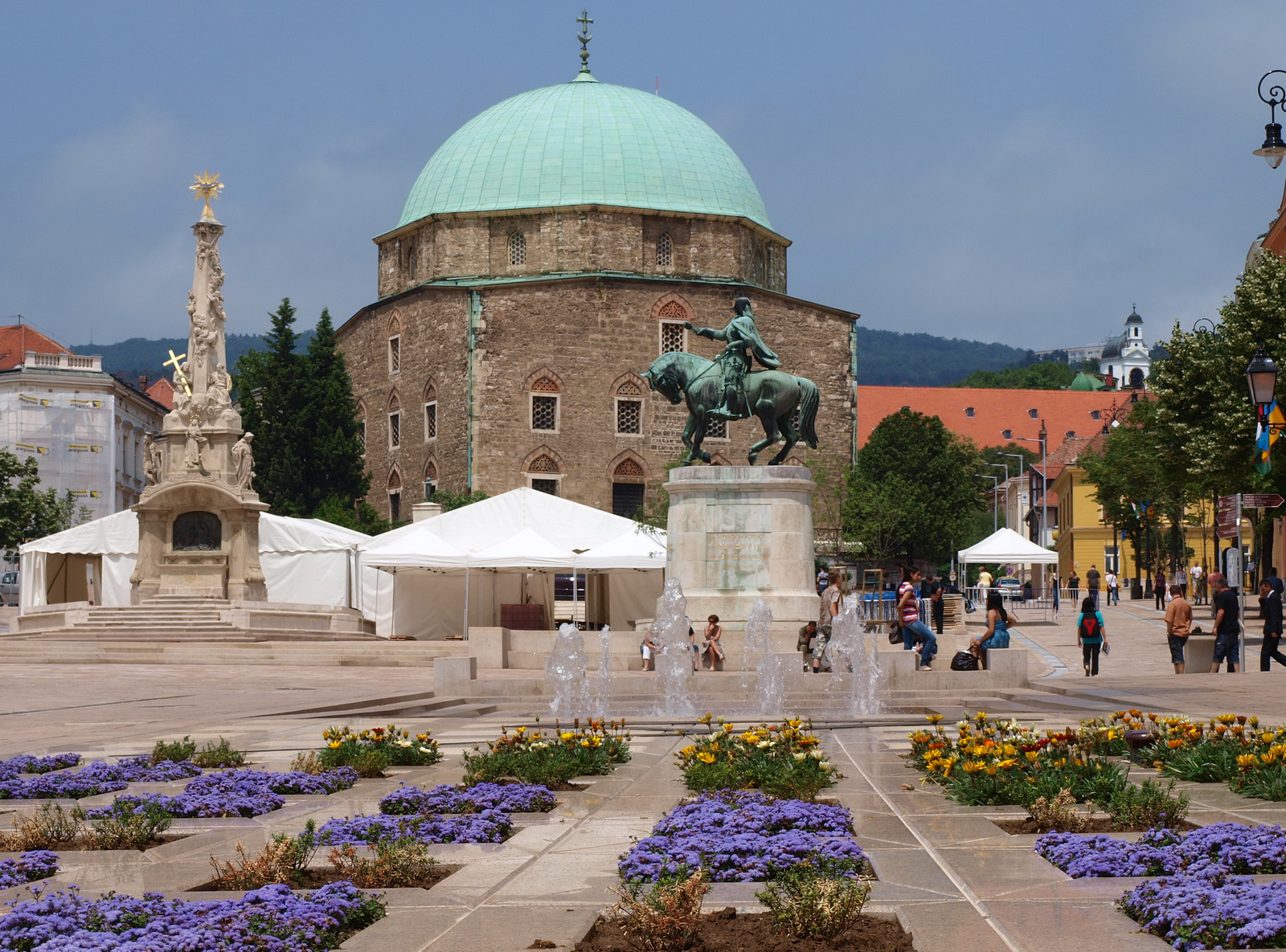
- The church with the Holy Trinity statue (1714) and the John Hunyadi statue (1956)
- Downtown Candlemas Church of the Blessed Virgin Mary
- 46°4′37″N 18°13′41″E
- Location: Pécs
- Country: Hungary
- Denomination: Catholic
- Previous denomination: Islam
- Churchmanship: Latin

History
- Former name: Mosque of Pasha Qasim
- Status: Church (since 1702); Mosque (1540s–1702)

Architecture
- Functional status: Active
- Architectural type: Mosque architecture
- Style: Ottoman architecture
- Completed: c. 1540s (as a mosque); 1702 (as a church)

Specifications
- Length: 29 m (95 ft)
- Width: 16 m (52 ft)
- Height: 23 m (75 ft)

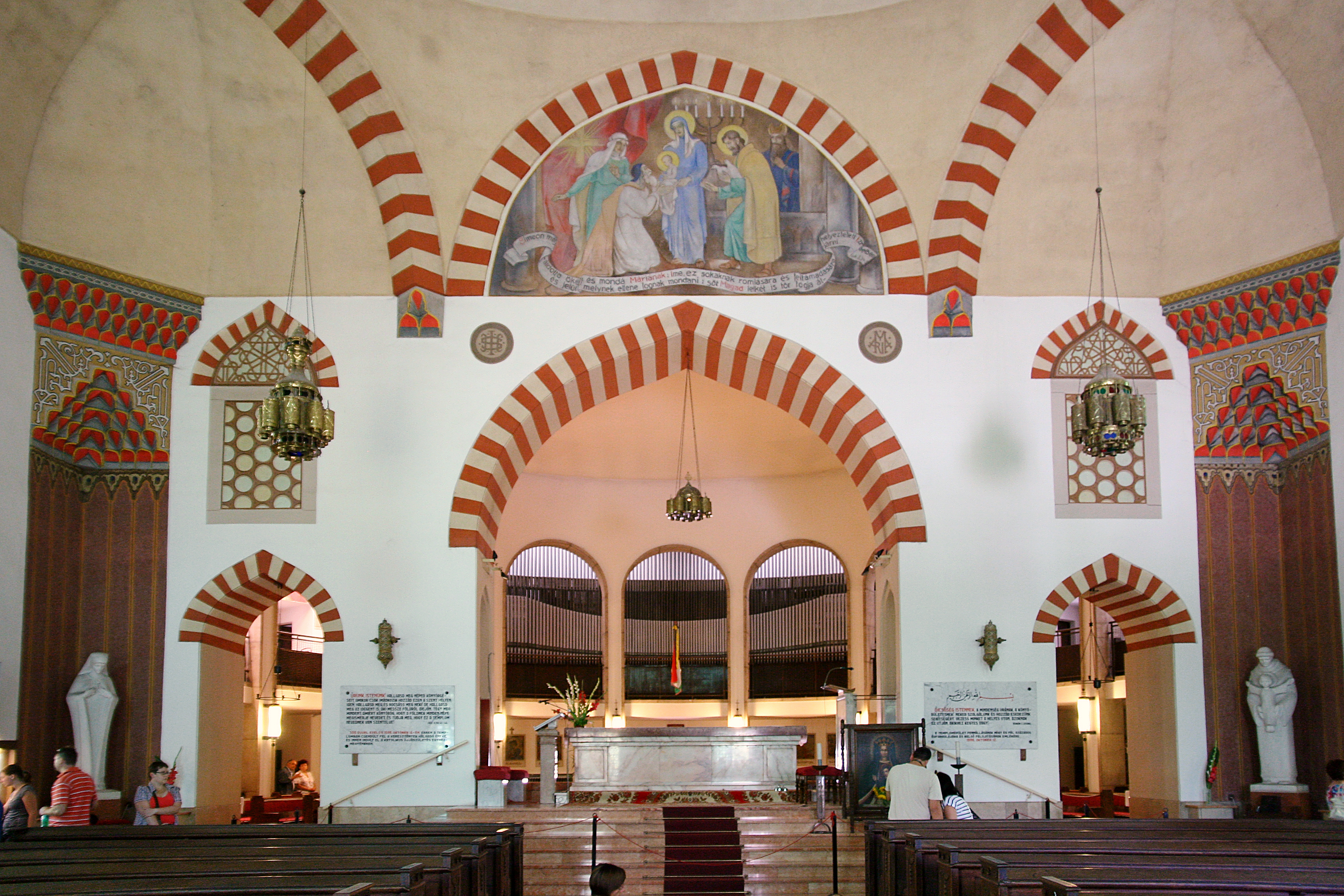
Interior of the church with Ottoman Turkish elements

The Downtown Candlemas Church of the Blessed Virgin Mary (Hungarian: Belvárosi Gyertyaszentelő Boldogasszony-templom), formerly known as the Mosque of Pasha Qasim (Hungarian: Gázi Kászim pasa dzsámija, Turkish: Gazi Kasım Paşa Camii) is a Catholic church in Pécs, Hungary, which was a mosque in the 16–17th century due to the Ottoman conquest. It is one of the symbols of the city, located in the downtown, on the main square (Széchenyi square). The current building, a hundred steps in length and in width, was built by Pasha Qasim the Victorious between 1543 and 1546. The mosque was converted into a church in 1702, after Habsburg-Hungarian troops reconquered the city. The minaret was destroyed by the Jesuits in 1766. One of the largest Ottoman constructions remaining in Hungary, the building still retains many Turkish architectural characteristics.

== History ==
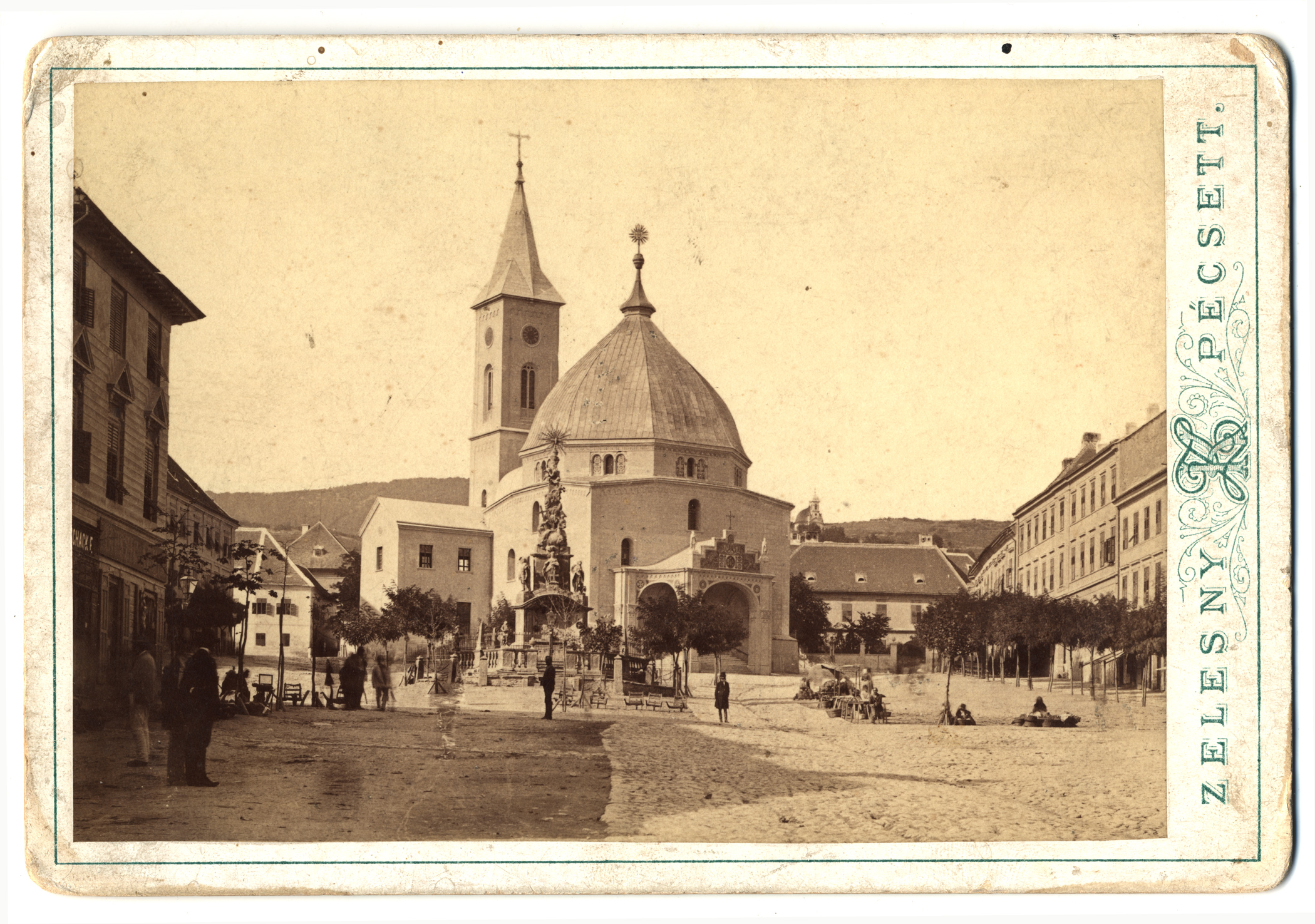
Széchenyi square in the 1880s

Standing at the highest point of Pécs's Széchenyi square, the mosque-turned-church is representative of the Turkish style of architecture in Hungary. It is thought to have been constructed in the second half of the 16th century, several years after the Ottoman occupation of Pécs in 1543. In the 1660s, the famous Turkish traveller Evliya Çelebi praised the view from the mosque in writing.

A number of changes were made to the building between the 18th and the 20th centuries as part of the mosque's conversion to a Roman Catholic church. Its minaret was taken down after having been enlarged, leaving only the bulk (the octagon drum, covered by a dome, patterned after traditional Orthodox cathedrals) of the original structure remaining. Arc windows were set in two rows on the façades of the southeastern, southwestern, and northeastern sides of the building, in 3–3 and 4-4 patterns. Inside, some Ottoman decoration and inscriptions from the Qur'an are clearly visible in the remaining plaster parts. The Turkish pulpit and the women's balcony were destroyed, and the mihrab was removed (but later replaced). The two Turkish bathing basins before the sacristies (today, holy water) were taken from the former bath of the pasha next to the church.

== Bibliography ==
- Jenő, Rados (1961). Műszaki, K. (ed.). Magyar építészettörténet (in Hungarian). ETO 72 (439) 091. pp. 161–168.
- Szerk, Fülep L. (1961). Képzőmúv, Alap K. (ed.). A magyarországi művészet története (in Hungarian). Kossuth Ny. 61.3465. pp. 371–372.
- Ignác, Goldziher (1981). Gondolat, K. (ed.). Az iszlám kultúrája (in Hungarian). ISBN 963-280-607-7.
- Stierlin, H. Alexandra, K. (ed.). Iszlám művészet és építészet (in Hungarian). ISBN 963-368-127-8.
- Stierlin, H. (1998). Türkei – Architektur von Seldschuken bis Osmanen (in German). Taschen Weltarchitektur –. ISBN 3-8228-7857-X.
