= Church of Santiago, Toledo =

13th-century church in Toledo, Spain

Church of Saint James
- Iglesia de Santiago el Mayor
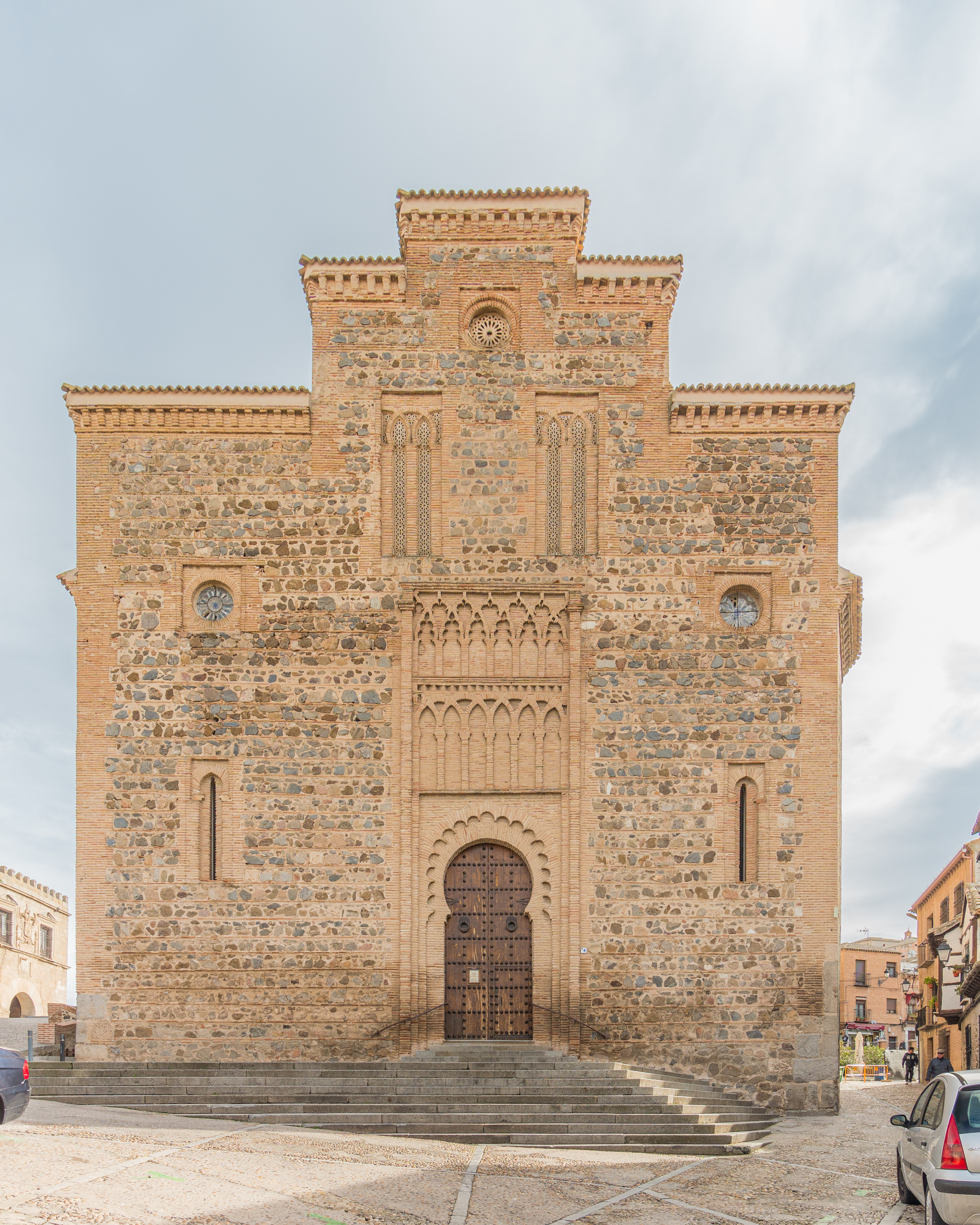
- West façade in 2025
- Church of Saint James
- 39.8620°N 4.0255°W
- Location: Toledo
- Address: 4, Plaza de Santiago del Arrabal
- Country: Spain
- Denomination: Catholic

History
- Dedication: James the Great

Architecture
- Style: Mudéjar
- Years built: 13th Century

Administration
- Metropolis: Toledo

UNESCO World Heritage Site
- Criteria: Cultural: (i), (ii), (iii), (iv)
- Designated: 1986 (3rd session)
- Part of: Historic City of Toledo
- Reference no.: 379

Spanish Cultural Heritage
- Type: Non-movable
- Criteria: Monument
- Reference no.: RI-51-0000938

The Church of St James the Great, known in Spanish as Iglesia de Santiago el Mayor or de Santiago del Arrabal, is a 13th-century Roman Catholic church in Toledo, Spain.

== History ==
Construction of the church was commissioned by Sancho II and began between 1245 and 1247. It was built on the site of previous buildings, including a Visigothic structure and a later mosque whose use is documented from 1125. Construction was paused in 1248, after Sancho's death, but resumed again under the patronage of the Diosdado family, members of the Order of Santiago. The church was heavily restored between 1958 and 1973 and much of its present appearance is due to this restoration.

The church was constructed in Mudéjar style with influences from the Romanesque style of Castile. The freestanding bell-tower incorporated the remains of the former mosque's minaret.
