= List of beaches in Portugal =

This is a list of beaches in Portugal, listed by regions and subregions, municipalities and parishes.

== Norte ==
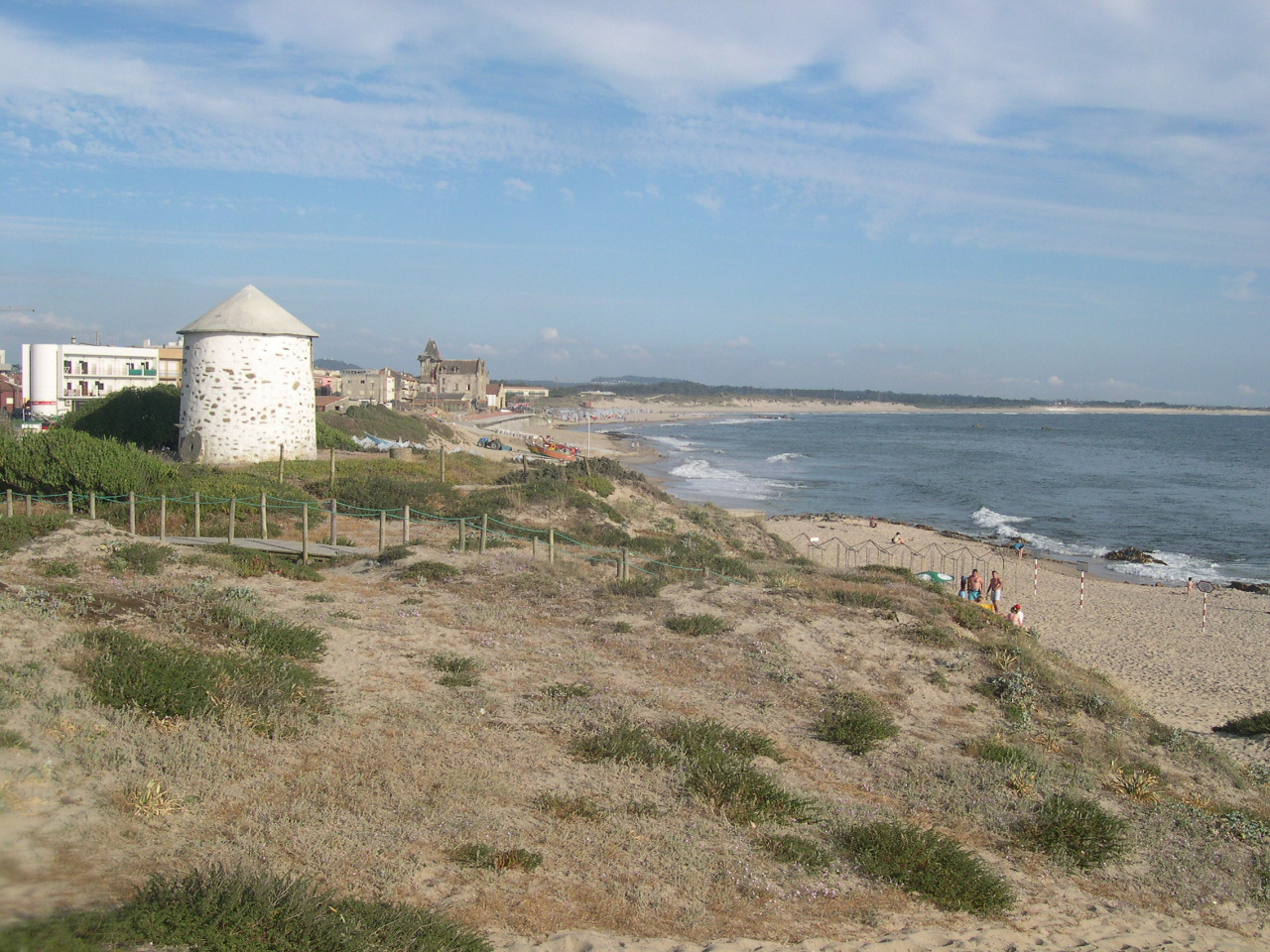
Looking down the coast of Praia de Apúlia with one of historic windmills

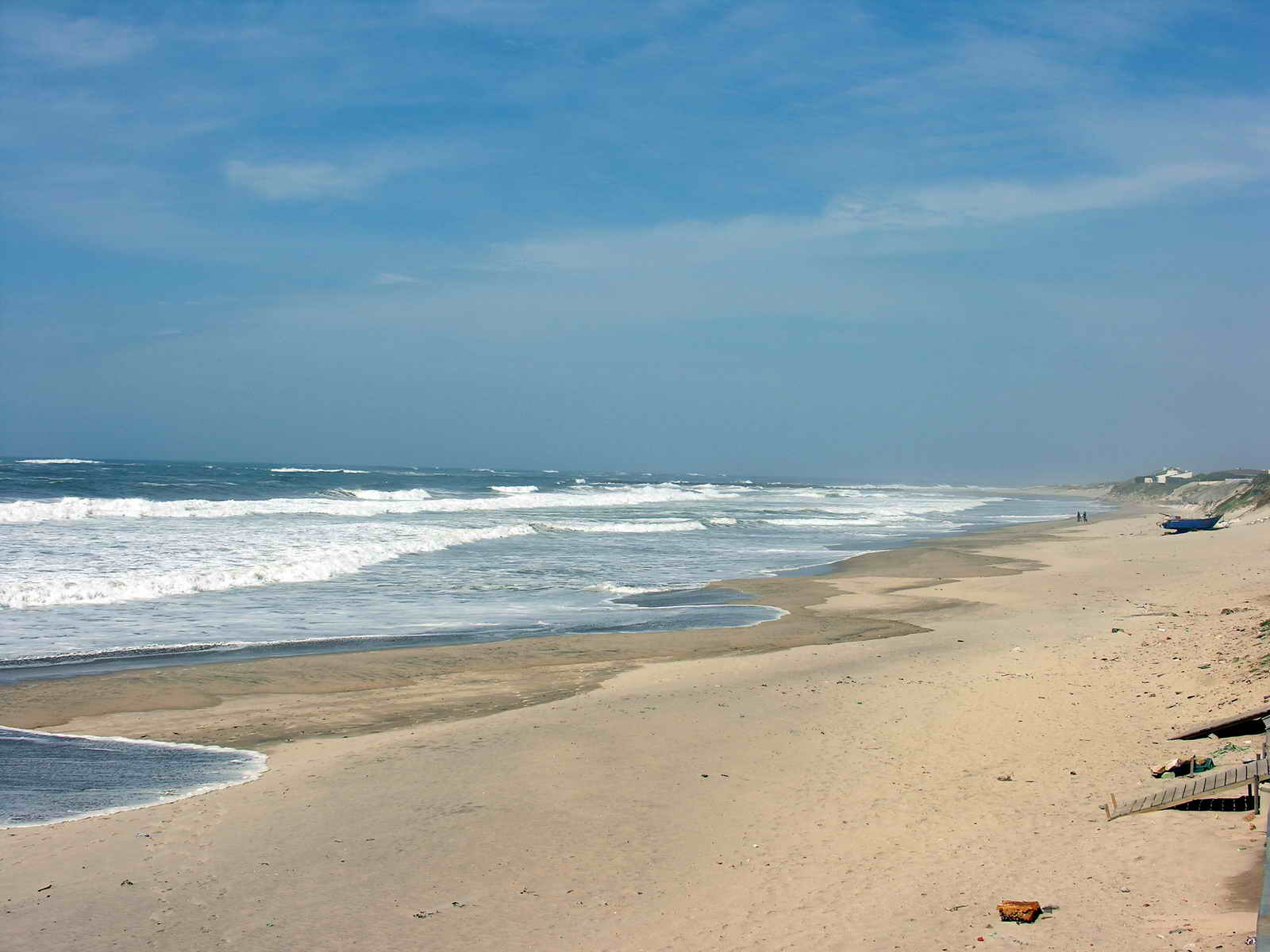
The shallow coast of the Praia de Ofir

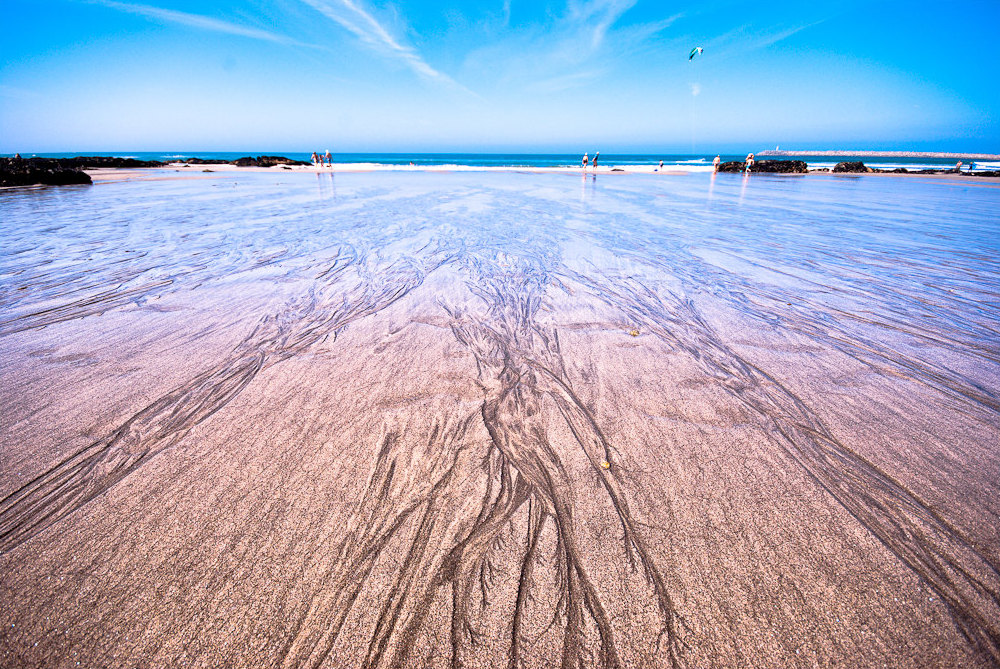
The clear waters on the coastal bar of Praia de Cabedelo/Luzia Mar

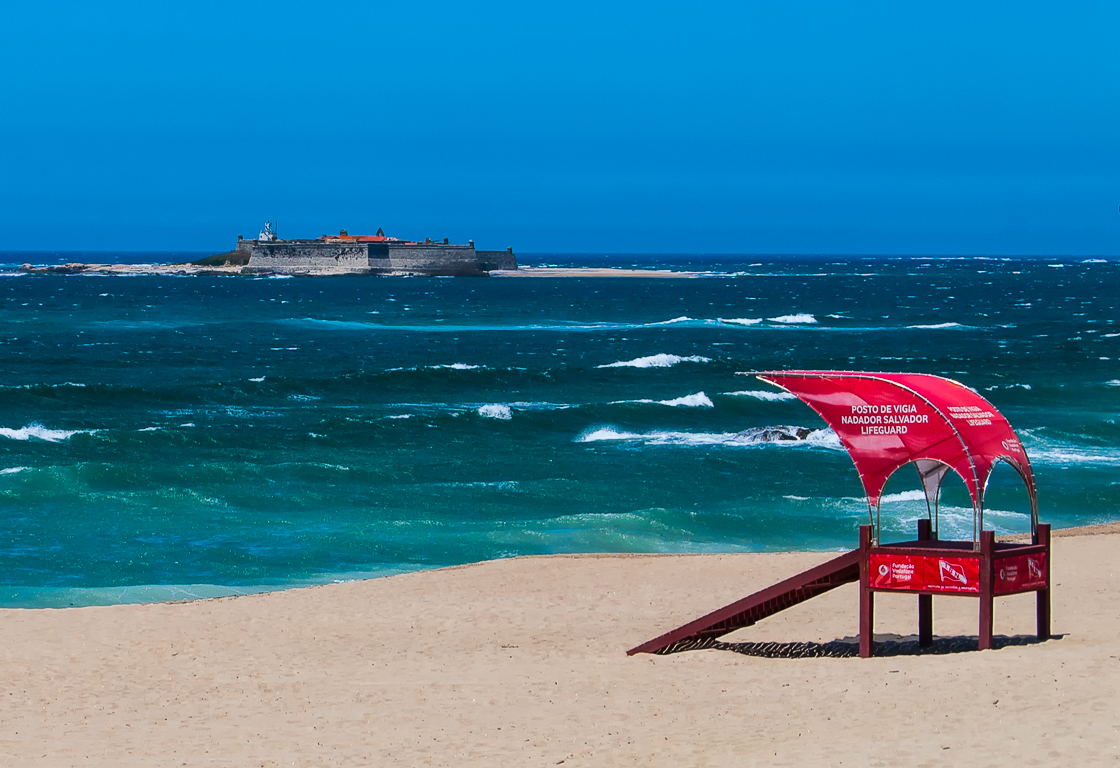
A vista to the protective fort along the Praia de Modelo in Caminha

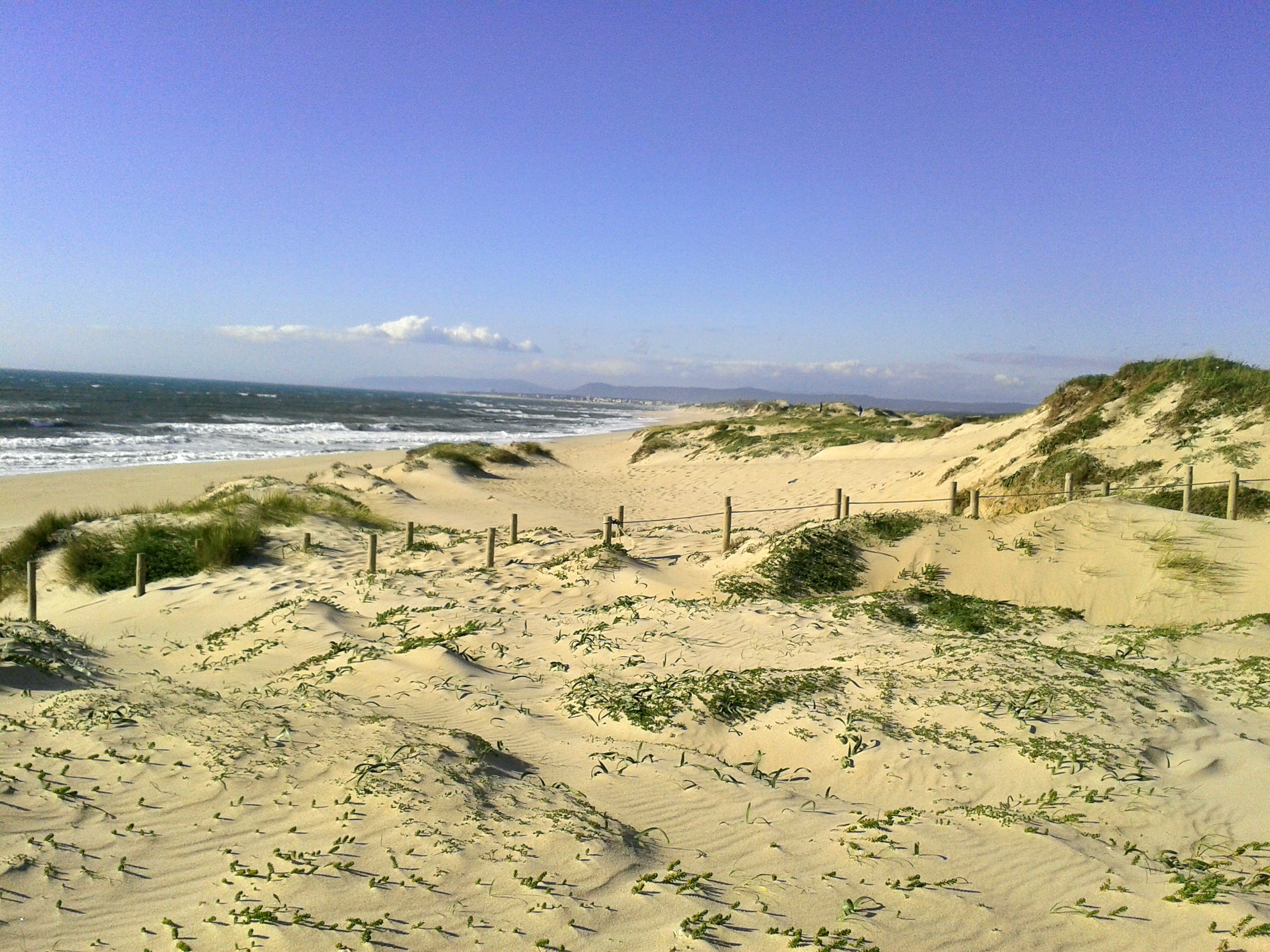
The dunes of the beach of Póvoa do Varzim

=== Alto Minho ===
- Praia Azul (Caminha)
- Praia da Amorosa Nova (Viana do Castelo)
- Praia da Amorosa Velha (Viana do Castelo)
- Praia da Arda (Viana do Castelo)
- Praia da Argocosa (Viana do Castelo)
- Praia da Congreira (Caminha)
- Praia da Insua (Viana do Castelo)
- Praia da Ladeira (Caminha)
- Praia da Lenta (Caminha)
- Praia da Luzimar (Caminha)
- Praia da Olinda (Caminha)
- Praia da Rodanho (Viana do Castelo)
- Praia da Senhora da Guia (Caminha)
- Praia das Pontes Norte (Viana do Castelo)
- Praia da Vila Cha (Caminha)
- Praia de Afife (Viana do Castelo)
- Praia de Arvore (Caminha)
- Praia de Caminha (Caminha)
- Praia de Vila Praia de Âncora (Vila Praia de Âncora, Caminha)
- Praia do Aquario (Viana do Castelo)
- Praia do Bico Arda (Viana do Castelo)
- Praia do Cabedelo (Darque, Viana do Castelo)
- Praia do Carreco (Viana do Castelo)
- Praia do Castelo do Neiva (Viana do Castelo)
- Praia do Foz do Minho (Caminha)
- Praia do Mar e Sol (Caminha)
- Praia do Moledo (Caminha)
- Praia do Moreiro (Caminha)
- Praia do Paçô (Carreço, Viana do Castelo)
- Praia do Pinhal (Caminha)
- Praia do Por do Sol (Caminha)
- Praia do Puco (Caminha)
- Praia do Turismo (Caminha)
- Praia Fluvial da Valeta (Arcos de Valdevez)
- Praia fluvial de Ponte de Mouro (Monção)
- Praia Norte (Viana do Castelo)

=== Cávado ===
- Praia da Apúlia (Apúlia e Fão, Esposende)
- Praia de Belinho (Belinho e Mar, Esposende)
- Praia de Cepães (Esposende, Marinhas e Gandra, Esposende)
- Praia de Ofir (Apúlia e Fão, Esposende)
- Praia de Rio de Moinhos (Esposende, Marinhas e Gandra, Esposende)
- Praia de S. Bartolomeu do Mar (Belinho e Mar, Esposende)
- Praia de Suave Mar (Esposende, Marinhas e Gandra, Esposende)
- Praia fluvial de Adaufe (Braga)
- Praia fluvial de Verim (Braga)

=== Douro ===
- Praia Fluvial da Congida (Freixo de Espada a Cinta)
- Praia fluvial de Fornelos (Santa Marta de Penaguiao)
- Praia Fluvial de Mondim da Beira (Tarouca)
- Praia Fluvial de Sao Martinho (Nagozelo do Douro, Sao Joao da Pesqueira)

=== Porto metropolitan area ===
- Piscinas de Marés (Matosinhos e Leça da Palmeira, Matosinhos)
- Praia Azul (Povoa de Varzim)
- Praia Azul (Vila do Conde)
- Praia Azul (Conchinha) (Matosinhos)
- Praia da Aguda (Arcozelo, Vila Nova de Gaia)
- Praia da Agudela (Matosinhos)
- Praia da Azurara (Vila do Conde)
- Praia da Baía (Espinho)
- Praia da Barranha (Estela, Póvoa de Varzim)
- Praia da Boa Nova (Matosinhos)
- Praia da Codicheira (Aguçadoura e Navais, Póvoa de Varzim)
- Praia da Foz (Porto)
- Praia da Frente Azul (Espinho)
- Praia da Granja (São Félix da Marinha, Vila Nova de Gaia)
- Praia da Ladeira (Vila do Conde)
- Praia da Madalena (Vila Nova de Gaia)
- Praia da Memória (Perafita, Lavra e Santa Cruz do Bispo, Matosinhos)
- Praia da Pedra Negra (Aver-o-Mar, Amorim e Terroso, Póvoa de Varzim)
- Praia da Quebrada (Matosinhos)
- Praia da Saozinha (Vila Nova de Gaia)
- Praia das Caxinas (Vila do Conde)
- Praia das Pedra Brancas (Matosinhos)
- Praia de Aguçadoura (Aguçadoura e Navais, Póvoa de Varzim)
- Praia de Angeiras Norte (Matosinhos)
- Praia de Angeiras Sul (Matosinhos)
- Praia de Canide (Vila Nova de Gaia)
- Praia de Coim (Aver-o-Mar, Amorim e Terroso, Póvoa de Varzim)
- Praia de Dunas Mar (Vila Nova de Gaia)
- Praia de Esteiro (Aver-o-Mar, Amorim e Terroso, Póvoa de Varzim)
- Praia de Fragosa (Aver-o-Mar, Amorim e Terroso, Póvoa de Varzim)
- Praia de Francelos (Vila Nova de Gaia)
- Praia de Francemar (Vila Nova de Gaia)
- Praia de Fuzelhas (Matosinhos)
- Praia de Gondarem/Molhe (Porto)
- Praia de Labruge (Labruge, Vila do Conde)
- Praia de Lagoa (Aver-o-Mar, Amorim e Terroso, Póvoa de Varzim)
- Praia de Lavadores (Vila Nova de Gaia)
- Praia de Leca da Palmeira (Matosinhos)
- Praia de Matosinhos (Matosinhos)
- Praia de Miramar (Gulpilhares e Valadares, Vila Nova de Gaia)
- Praia de Paimó (Aguçadoura e Navais, Póvoa de Varzim)
- Praia de Pedras do Corgo (Matosinhos)
- Praia de Quião (Aver-o-Mar, Amorim e Terroso, Póvoa de Varzim)
- Praia de Rio Alto (Estela, Póvoa de Varzim)
- Praia de Salgueira (Póvoa de Varzim, Beiriz e Argivai, Póvoa de Varzim)
- Praia de Salgueiros (Vila Nova de Gaia)
- Praia de Santo André (Aguçadoura e Navais, Póvoa de Varzim)
- Praia de Valadares Norte (Vila Nova de Gaia)
- Praia de Valadares Sul (Vila Nova de Gaia)
- Praia do Aterro (Matosinhos)
- Praia do Cabedelo (Canidelo, Vila Nova de Gaia)
- Praia do Cabo do Mundo (Matosinhos)
- Praia do Carvalhido (Póvoa de Varzim, Beiriz e Argivai, Póvoa de Varzim)
- Praia do Castelo do Queijo (Porto)
- Praia do Forno (Vila do Conde)
- Praia do Funtao (Matosinhos)
- Praia do Homem do Leme (Porto)
- Praia do Mar e Sol (Vila Nova de Gaia)
- Praia do Marreco (Matosinhos)
- Praia do Mindelo (Vila do Conde)
- Praia do Pinhal (Vila do Conde)
- Praia do Puço (Vila do Conde, Vila do Conde)
- Praia dos Beijinhos (Póvoa de Varzim, Beiriz e Argivai, Póvoa de Varzim)
- Praia do Senhor da Pedra (Vila Nova de Gaia)
- Praia Verde (Póvoa de Varzim, Beiriz e Argivai, Póvoa de Varzim)
- Redonda Beach (Póvoa de Varzim, Beiriz e Argivai, Póvoa de Varzim)

=== Terras de Trás-os-Montes ===
- Praia de Ponte da Ranca (Vinhais)
- Praia de Ponte de Frades (Vinhais)
- Praia de Ponte Soeira (Vinhais)
- Praia do Albufeira do Azibo (Macedo de Cavaleiros)
- Praia do Azibo (Podence e Santa Combinha, Macedo de Cavaleiros)
- Praia Fluvial da Albufeira de Esteveinha (Alfandega da Fe)
- Praia Fluvial de Frechas (Mirandela)

== Centro ==
=== Beira Baixa ===
- Praia Fluvial da Froia (Proenca-a-Nova)
- Praia Fluvial de Aldeia Ruiva (Proenca-a-Nova)
- Praia Fluvial de Almaceda (Castelo Branco)
- Praia Fluvial de Alvito da Beira (Proenca-a-Nova)
- Praia Fluvial do Acude Pinto (Oleiros)
- Praia Fluvial do Malhadal (Proenca-a-Nova)
- Praia Fluvial do Sesmo (Castelo Branco)
- Praia Fluvial dos Lentiscais (Castelo Branco)

=== Beiras e Serra da Estrela ===
- Barragem da Capinha (Fundão)
- Praia Fluvial da Vila Cova a Coelheira (Seia)
- Praia Fluvial de Castelo Novo (Fundão)
- Praia Fluvial de Cortes do Meio (Covilha)
- Praia Fluvial de Janeiro de Cima (Fundão)
- Praia Fluvial de Lapa dos Dinheiros (Seia)
- Praia Fluvial de Loriga (Seia)
- Praia Fluvial de Ponte de Juncais (Fornos de Algodres)
- Praia Fluvial de Valhelhas (Guarda)
- Praia Fluvial do Sabugueiro (Seia)
- Praia Fluvial do Vale do Rossim (Gouveia)
- Zona balnear de Lavacolhos (Fundão)
- Zona balnear de Souto da Casa (Fundão)

=== Médio Tejo ===
- Penedo Furado (Vila de Rei, Vila de Rei)
- Piscina flutuante do Lago Azul (Ferreira do Zezere)
- Praia Fluvial da Aldeia do Mato (Abrantes)
- Praia Fluvial da Ortiga (Mação)
- Praia Fluvial da Ribeira Grande (Sertã)
- Praia Fluvial das Fernandaires (Vila de Rei)
- Praia Fluvial de Cardigos (Mação)
- Praia Fluvial do Bostelim (Vila de Rei)
- Praia Fluvial do Carvoeiro (Mação)
- Praia Fluvial do Pego das Cancelas (Vila de Rei)
- Praia Fluvial do Penedo Furado (Vila de Rei)
- Praia Fluvial do Troviscal (Sertã)

=== Oeste ===
- Praia Azul (Torres Vedras)
- Praia da Areia Branca (Lourinhã e Atalaia, Lourinhã)
- Praia da Consolação (Atouguia da Baleia, Peniche)
- Praia da Cova de Alfarroba (Peniche)
- Praia da Falca (Alcobaça)
- Praia da Fisica (Torres Vedras)
- Praia da Foz do Arelho (Caldas da Rainha)
- Praia da Gamboa (Peniche)
- Praia da Gralha (Alcobaça)
- Praia da Lagoa de Obidos (Óbidos)
- Praia da Legua (Alcobaça)
- Praia da Nazaré (Nazaré, Nazaré)
- Praia da Pedra do Ouro (Alcobaça)
- Praia da Peralta (Lourinhã e Atalaia, Lourinhã)
- Praia da Polvoeira (Alcobaça)
- Praia de Agua de Madeiros (Alcobaça)
- Praia de Aguas Luxuosas (Alcobaça)
- Praia de Paimogo (Lourinhã e Atalaia, Lourinhã)
- Praia de Paredes da Vitoria (Alcobaça)
- Praia de Porto das Barcas (Lourinhã e Atalaia, Lourinhã)
- Praia de Salir do Porto (Caldas da Rainha)
- Praia de Santa Cruz (Torres Vedras)
- Praia de Santa Rita (Torres Vedras)
- Praia de Sao Martinho do Porto (Alcobaça)
- Praia de Vale Frades (Lourinhã e Atalaia, Lourinhã)
- Praia de Vale Furado (Pataias)
- Praia de Valmitão (Ribamar, Lourinhã)
- Praia de Zimbral (Ribamar, Lourinhã)
- Praia do Areal (Lourinhã e Atalaia, Lourinhã)
- Praia do Baleal-Campismo (Peniche)
- Praia do Baleal-Norte (Peniche)
- Praia do Baleal-Sul (Peniche)
- Praia do Caniçal (Lourinhã e Atalaia, Lourinhã)
- Praia do Mar (Caldas da Rainha)
- Praia do Mirante (Torres Vedras)
- Praia do Navio (Torres Vedras)
- Praia do Norte (Nazaré)
- Praia do Pisao (Torres Vedras)
- Praia do Porto Dinheiro (Ribamar, Lourinhã)
- Praia do Rei Cortico (Óbidos)
- Praia do Salgado (Alcobaça/Nazaré)
- Praia dos Belgas (Óbidos)
- Praia dos Supertubos (Atouguia da Baleia, Peniche)
- Praia Formosa (Torres Vedras)

=== Região de Aveiro ===
- Costa Nova (Aveiro)
- Praia da Barra (Aveiro)
- Praia da Barra (Ilhavo)
- Praia da Barrinha (Esmoriz)
- Praia da Cortegaca (Ovar)
- Praia da Costa Nova (Ilhavo)
- Praia das Dunas de Sao Jacinto (Aveiro)
- Praia da Torreira (Murtosa)
- Praia da Vagueira (Vagos)
- Praia de Esmoriz (Ovar)
- Praia do Areao (Vagos)
- Praia do Furadouro (Ovar, São João, Arada e São Vicente de Pereira Jusã, Ovar)
- Praia Fluvial de Souto do Rio (Agueda)
- Praia pequena (Esmoriz)

=== Região de Coimbra ===
- Praia da Bogueira (Lousã)
- Praia da Loucainha (Penela)
- Praia da Senhora da Graca (Lousã)
- Praia da Senhora da Piedade (Lousã)
- Praia da Tocha (Tocha, Cantanhede)
- Praia de Cova-Gala (Figueira da Foz)
- Praia de Leirosa (Figueira da Foz)
- Praia de Mira (Praia de Mira, Mira)
- Praia de Quiaios (Quiaios, Figueira da Foz)
- Praia do Cabedelo (São Pedro, Figueira da Foz)
- Praia do Palheirao (Cantanhede)
- Praia do Relogio (Figueira da Foz)
- Praia dos Almadoiros (Cantanhede)
- Praia Fluvial da Albufeira de Santa Luzia (Pampilhosa da Serra)
- Praia Fluvial da Peneda/Pego Escuro (Góis)
- Praia Fluvial das Canaveias (Góis)
- Praia Fluvial de Alvoco das Varzeas (Oliveira do Hospital)
- Praia Fluvial de Ourondo (Coimbra)
- Praia fluvial de Palheiros e Zorro (Coimbra)
- Praia Fluvial de Pampilhosa da Serra (Pampilhosa da Serra)
- Praia Fluvial de Piodao (Arganil)
- Praia Fluvial de Sandomil (Oliveira do Hospital)
- Praia Fluvial de Unhais da Serra (Coimbra)
- Praia Fluvial de Verdelhos (Coimbra)
- Praia Fluvial de Vila do Carvalho (Coimbra)
- Praia Fluvial do Paul (Coimbra)
- Praia Fluvial do Pessegueiro (Pampilhosa da Serra)

=== Região de Leiria ===
- Praia da Concha (Marinha Grande)
- Praia da Lugar das Pedras (Leiria)
- Praia da Pedra Negras (Marinha Grande)
- Praia das Rocas (Castanheira de Pera)
- Praia das Valeiras (Marinha Grande)
- Praia da Vieira (Marinha Grande)
- Praia de Pedrogao (Leiria)
- Praia de Sao Pedro de Moel (Marinha Grande)
- Praia do Fausto (Leiria)
- Praia do Osso da Baleia (Pombal)
- Praia do Samouco (Marinha Grande)
- Praia fluvial das Fragas de Sao Simao (Figueiro dos Vinhos)
- Praia fluvial de Aldeia Ana de Aviz (Figueiro dos Vinhos)
- Praia Fluvial de Poco Corga (Castanheira de Pera)
- Praia Fonte dos Agrioes (Pombal)
- Praia Velha (Marinha Grande)

=== Viseu Dão Lafões ===
- Praia fluvial de Folgosa (Castro Daire)
- Praia Fluvial de Nandufe (Tondela)
- Ruinas da Ponte de Cabacos (Castro Daire)

== Lisboa ==
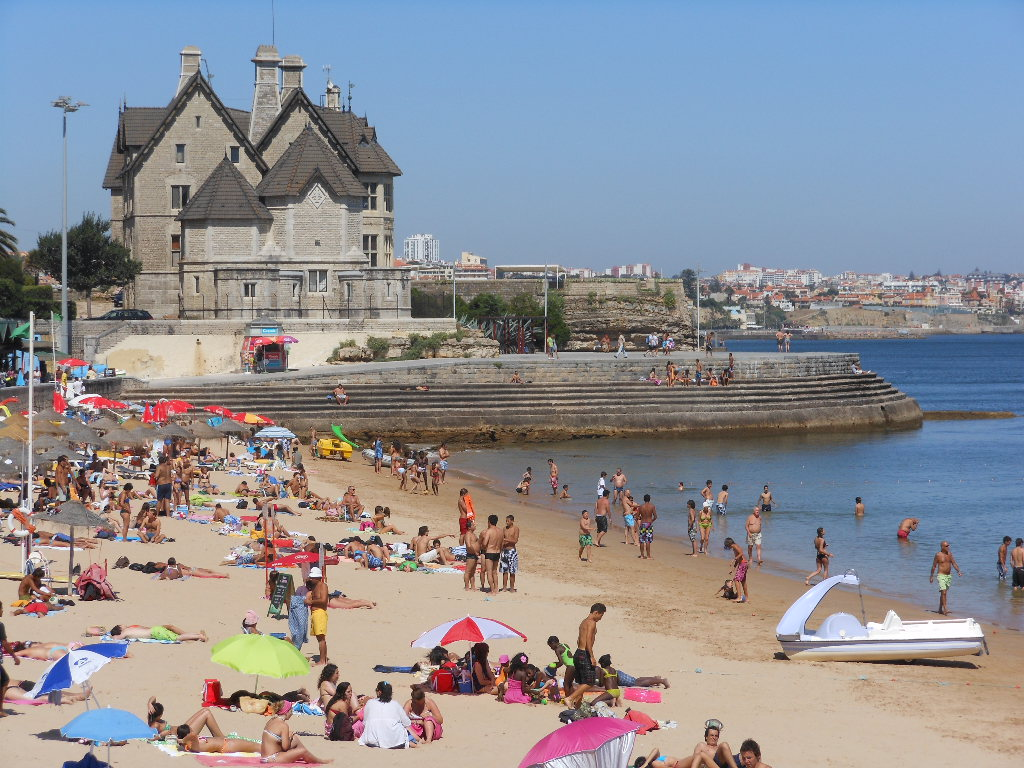
The coastal beach of Praia do Tamariz, in the town of Estoril in Cascais

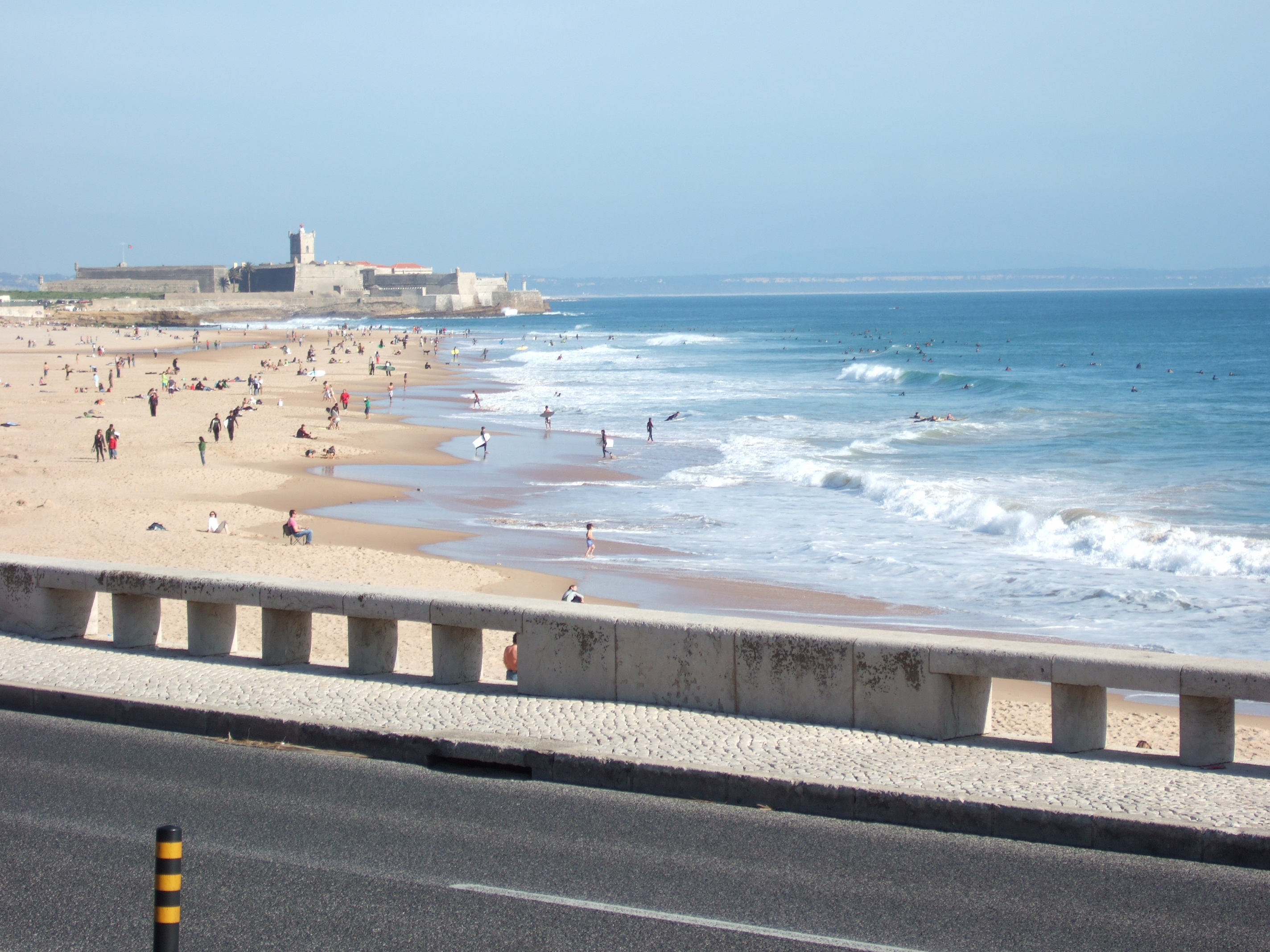
The Praia de Carcavelos with the fortress of São Julião da Barra

- Alburrica (Barreiro)
- Azenhas do Mar (Colares, Sintra)
- Praia Atlântica (Carvalhal, Grândola)
- Praia CCA (Almada)
- Praia CCL (Almada)
- Praia da Aberta Nova (Melida, Grândola)
- Praia da Adraga (Colares, Sintra)
- Praia da Aguda (Sintra)
- Praia da Azarujinha (Cascais)
- Praia da Bafureira (Cascais)
- Praia da Baleeira (Sesimbra)
- Praia da Balela (Sintra)
- Praia da Bela Vista (Costa da Caparica, Almada)
- Praia da Bexiga (Almada)
- Praia da Cabana Bar (Almada)
- Praia da Cabana do Pescador (Almada)
- Praia da Calada (Encarnação, Mafra)
- Praia da Conceicao (Cascais)
- Praia da Corre Agua (Mafra)
- Praia da Cova do Vapor (Almada)
- Praia da Crismina (Cascais)
- Praia da Cruz Quebrada (Oeiras)
- Praia da Duquesa (Cascais)
- Praia da Empa (Mafra)
- Praia da Figueirinha (Setúbal (São Julião, Nossa Senhora da Anunciada e Santa Maria da Graça), Setúbal)
- Praia da Fonte da Telha (Sesimbra)
- Praia da Foz (Sesimbra)
- Praia da Foz do Lizandro (Carvoeira, Mafra)
- Praia da Lage (Oeiras)
- Praia da Lagoa de Albufeira (Sesimbra, Sesimbra)
- Praia da Lagoa de Albufeira-Mar (Sesimbra)
- Praia da Matinha (Mafra)
- Praia da Mijona (Sesimbra)
- Praia da Orelheira (Mafra)
- Praia da Parede (Carcavelos e Parede, Cascais)
- Praia da Pesqueira (Mafra)
- Praia da Pipa (Sesimbra)
- Praia da Poca (Cascais)
- Praia da Rainha (Cascais)
- Praia da Rata (Cascais)
- Praia da Ribeira (Mafra)
- Praia das Acacias (Almada)
- Praia da Saude (Setubal)
- Praia das Azenhas do Mar (Sintra)
- Praia das Bicas (Sesimbra)
- Praia das Delicias da Praia (Almada)
- Praia das Fontainhas (Oeiras)
- Praia das Maçãs (Colares, Sintra)
- Praia das Moitas (Cascais e Estoril, Cascais)
- Praia da Torre (Oeiras)
- Praia da Tramagueira (Sesimbra)
- Praia da Ursa (Colares, Sintra)
- Praia de Albarquel (Setúbal (São Julião, Nossa Senhora da Anunciada e Santa Maria da Graça), Setúbal)
- Praia de Alfarim (Sesimbra)
- Praia de Alges (Oeiras)
- Praia de Carcavelos (Carcavelos e Parede, Cascais)
- Praia de Caxias (Oeiras)
- Praia de Galapos (Setubal)
- Praia de Galapinhos (Setubal)
- Praia de Melides (Melida, Grândola)
- Praia de Paço de Arcos (Oeiras e São Julião da Barra, Paço de Arcos e Caxias, Oeiras)
- Praia de Riveira d'Ilhas (Mafra)
- Praia de Santo Amaro de Oeiras (Oeiras e São Julião da Barra, Paço de Arcos e Caxias, Oeiras)
- Praia de Sao Juliao (Ericeira, Mafra)
- Praia de Sao Juliao (Sintra)
- Praia de Sao Lourenco (Mafra)
- Praia de Sao Pedro (Cascais)
- Praia de Sao Pedro do Estoril (Cascais)
- Praia do Abano (Alcabideche, Cascais)
- Praia do Albatroz (Almada)
- Praia do Alfacao (Mafra)
- Praia do Algodio (Mafra)
- Praia do Areia do Mastro (Sesimbra)
- Praia do Avencas (Cascais)
- Praia do Banco do Cavalinho (Santo Isidoro, Mafra)
- Praia do Banheiro (Costa da Caparica, Almada)
- Praia do Castelo (Almada)
- Praia do CDS (Almada)
- Praia do Centro (Almada)
- Praia do Creiro (Setubal)
- Praia do Dafundo (Oeiras)
- Praia do Forte da Ericeira (Mafra)
- Praia do Foz do Falcao (Mafra)
- Praia do Guincho (Cascais e Estoril, Cascais)
- Praia do Inferno (Sesimbra)
- Praia do Magoito (São João das Lampas e Terrugem, Sintra)
- Praia do Matadouro (Mafra)
- Praia do Meco (Moinho de Baixo, Sesimbra)
- Praia do Muro da Galera (Mafra)
- Praia do Outao (Setubal)
- Praia do Penedo Mouro (Mafra)
- Praia do Pesqueiro Alto (Mafra)
- Praia do Pissarao (Mafra)
- Praia do Poixo (Sintra)
- Praia do Portinho Correia (Mafra)
- Praia do Portinho da Arrabida (Setubal)
- Praia do Rebenta Bois (Sesimbra)
- Praia do Ribeiro do Cavalo (Sesimbra)
- Praia do Sao Sebastiao (Mafra)
- Praia dos Coelhos (Setubal)
- Praia dos Coxos (Mafra)
- Praia do Seixalinho (Mafra)
- Praia dos Lagosteiros (Sesimbra)
- Praia dos Penedos (Sesimbra)
- Praia dos Pescadores (Cascais)
- Praia dos Pescadores (Mafra)
- Praia dos Tombadoiros (Mafra)
- Praia do Sul (Baleia, Mafra)
- Praia do Tamariz (Cascais)
- Praia Grande (Colares, Sintra)
- Praia velha de Paco de Arcos ou dos Pescadores (Oeiras)
- Sesimbra ((Praia da California e Praia do Ouro), Sesimbra)

== Alentejo ==
=== Alentejo Litoral ===
- Praia Atlantica (Grandola)
- Praia da Aberta Nova (Grandola)
- Praia da Cerca Nova (Sines)
- Praia da Comporta (Grandola)
- Praia da Costa (Santiago do Cacem)
- Praia da Costa da Gale (Grandola)
- Praia da Costa do Norte (Sines)
- Praia da Fonte do Cortico (Santiago do Cacem)
- Praia da Foz (Sines)
- Praia da Franquia (Odemira)
- Praia da Gale (Grandola)
- Praia da Ilha do Pessegueiro (Sines)
- Praia da Lagoa (Vila Nova de Santo Andre, Santiago do Cacem)
- Praia da Navalheira (Sines)
- Praia da Oliveirinha (Sines)
- Praia da Samouqueira (Sines)
- Praia das Furnas (Odemira)
- Praia da Soltroia (Grandola)
- Praia da Vieirinha (Sines)
- Praia da Zambujeira do Mar (Odemira)
- Praia de Aivados (Sines)
- Praia de Almograve (Odemira)
- Praia de Carvalhal (Odemira)
- Praia de Faro (Odemira)
- Praia de Melides (Grandola)
- Praia de Morgavel (Sines)
- Praia de Santo Andre (Vila Nova de Santo Andre, Santiago do Cacem)
- Praia de São Torpes (Sines, Sines)
- Praia de Troiamar (Grandola)
- Praia de Vale de Figueiros (Sines)
- Praia do Bico das Lulas (Grandola)
- Praia do Burrinho (Sines)
- Praia do Carvalhal (Grandola)
- Praia do Cerro da Aguia (Sines)
- Praia do Espingardeiro (Sines)
- Praia do Malhao (Odemira)
- Praia do Monte Velho (Santiago do Cacem)
- Praia do Pego (Grandola)
- Praia dos Alteirinhos (Odemira)
- Praia do Salto (Sines)
- Praia dos Buzios (Sines)
- Praia Grande (Porto Covo, Sines)
- Praia Pequena (Sines)
- Praia Vasco da Gama (Sines)

=== Alto Alentejo ===
- Praia da Qunita do Alamal (Gavião)
- Praia Fluvial da Barragem do Caia (Campo Maior/Elvas)
- Praia Fluvial do Parque da Ribeira Grande (Fronteira)

=== Baixo Alentejo ===
- Praia Fluvial da Albuefire de Odivelas (Ferreira do Alentejo)

== Algarve ==
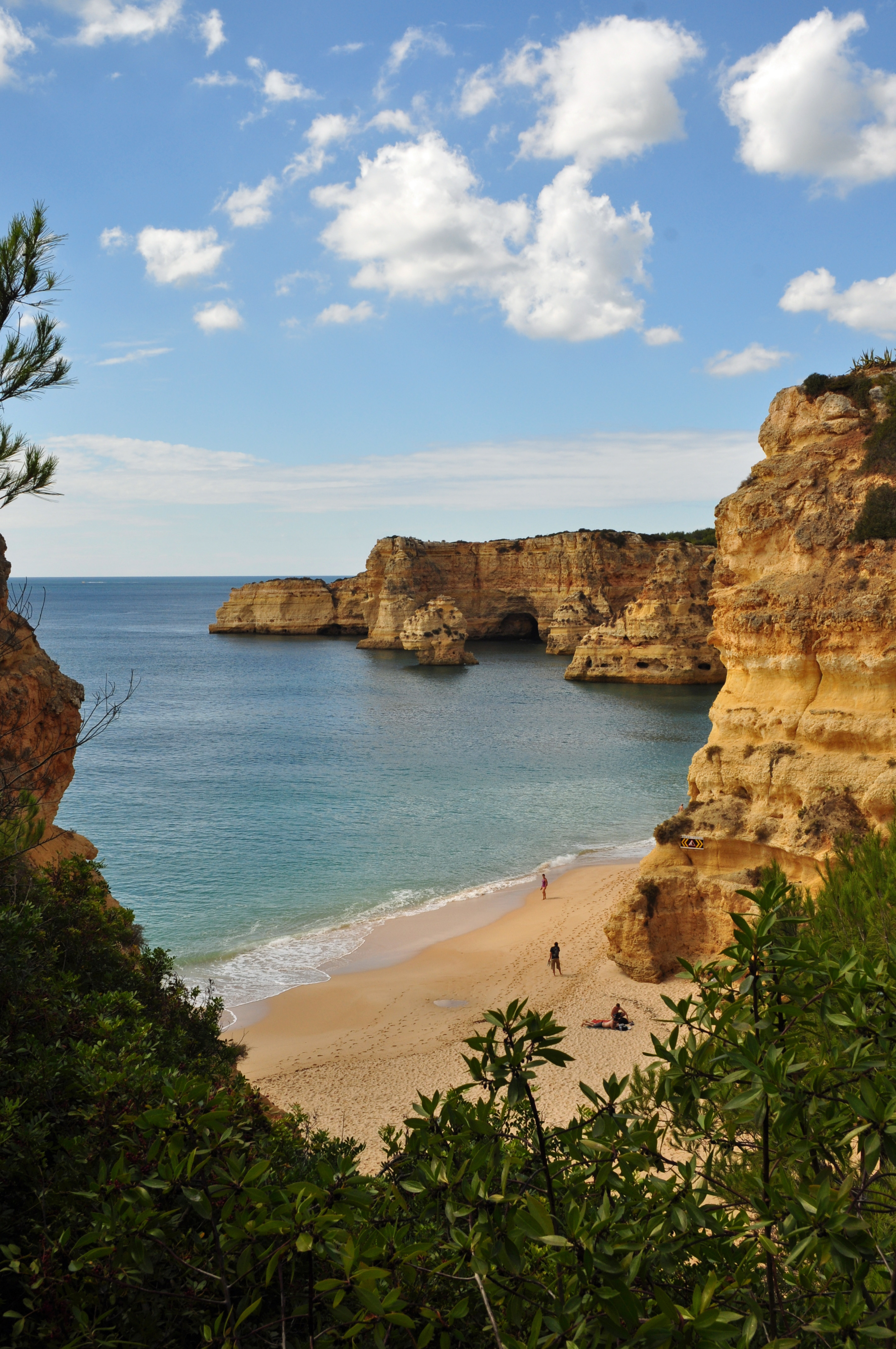
The world famous Praia da Marinha.

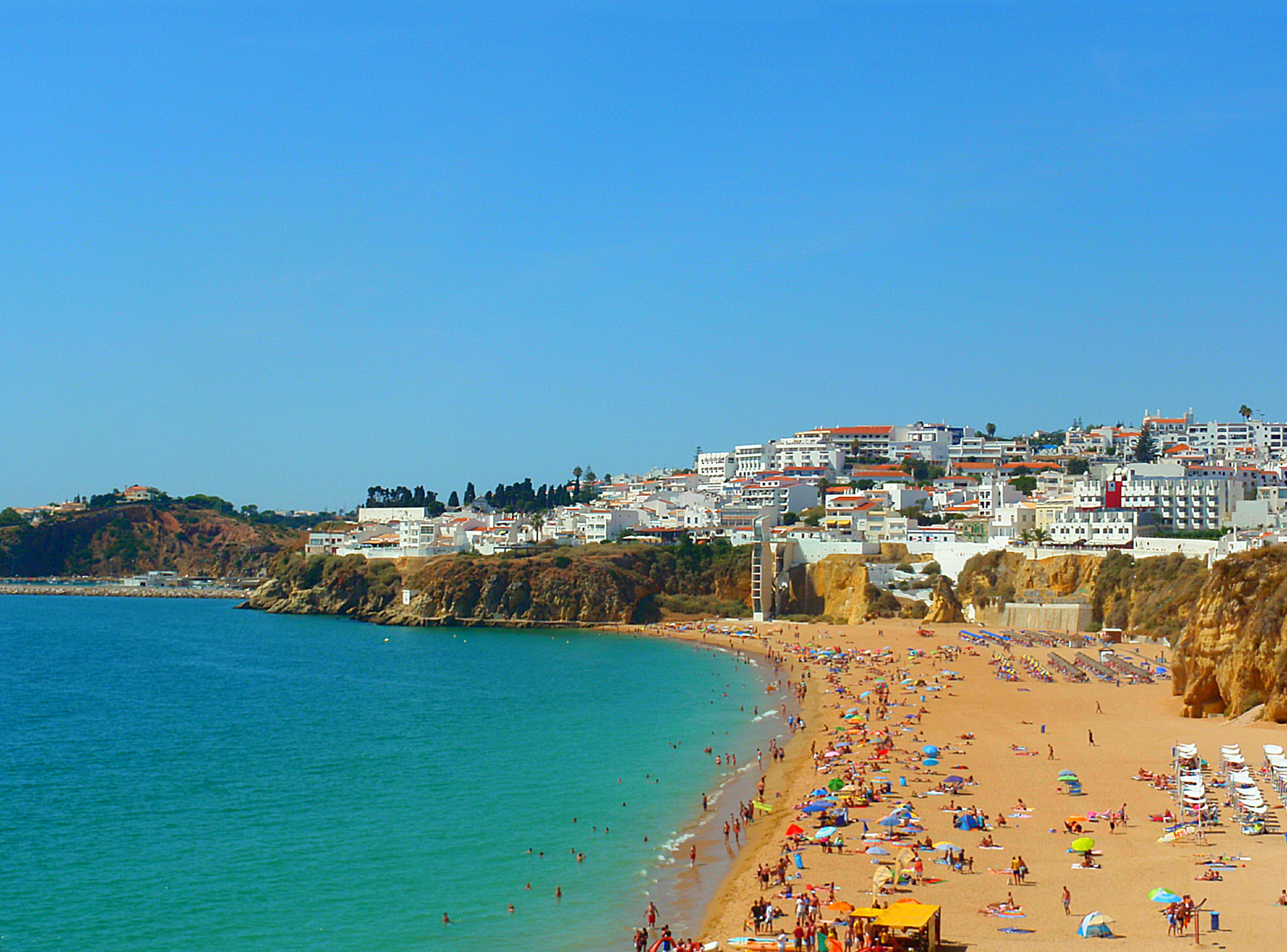
The gold coast of the former-fishing town of Praia do Pescador in Albufeira

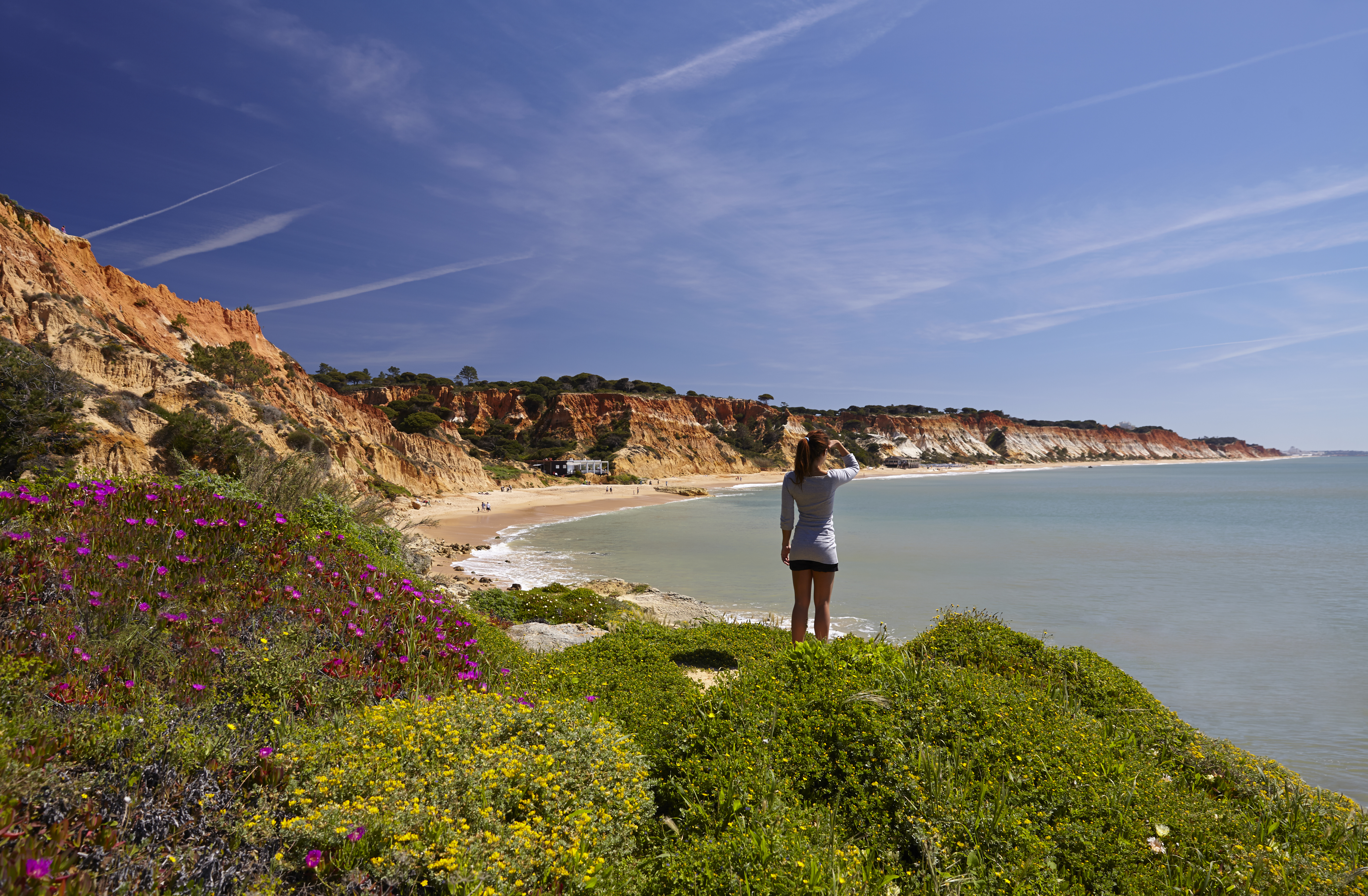
A view along the coast of Falésia beach from the Hotel Porto Bay Falésia

- Manta Rota (Vila Nova de Cacela, Vila Real de Santo António)
- Olheiros de Água Doce (Albufeira e Olhos de Água, Albufeira)
- Praia Belharucas (Albufeira)
- Praia da Agua (Vila do Bispo)
- Praia da Alagoa (Altura, Castro Marim)
- Praia da Albandeira (Lagoa)
- Praia da Almadena (Vila do Bispo)
- Praia da Amoreira (Aljezur, Aljezur)
- Praia da Angrinha (Ferragudo, Lagoa)
- Praia da Armona (Olhao)
- Praia da Arrifana (Aljezur, Aljezur)
- Praia da Baía dos Tiros (Rogil, Aljezur)
- Praia da Balaia (Albufeira e Olhos de Água, Albufeira)
- Praia da Baleeira (Albufeira)
- Praia da Baleeira (Vila do Bispo)
- Praia da Barreta (Faro)
- Praia da Barriga (Vila do Bispo)
- Praia da Batata (Lagos)
- Praia da Boca do Rio (Vila do Bispo)
- Praia da Bordeira (Bordeira, Aljezur)
- Praia da Carriagem (Rogil, Aljezur)
- Praia da Coelha (Albufeira e Olhos de Água, Albufeira)
- Praia da Cordoama (Vila do Bispo e Raposeira, Vila do Bispo)
- Praia da Cova Redonda (Lagoa)
- Praia da Culatra (Faro)
- Praia da Duna (Loulé)
- Praia da Fabrica (Vila Real de Santo Antonio)
- Praia da Falésia (Albufeira e Olhos de Água, Albufeira)
- Praia da Figueira (Vila do Bispo)
- Praia da Foz de Benacoitao (Vila do Bispo)
- Praia da Fuzeta (Olhao)
- Praia da Galé (Guia, Albufeira)
- Praia da Ilha de Tavira (Tavira (Santa Maria e Santiago), Tavira)
- Praia da Ilha do Cabo de Santa Maria (Faro)
- Praia da Ilha do Farol (Faro)
- Praia da Ingrina (Vila do Bispo e Raposeira, Vila do Bispo])
- Praia da Lota (Vila Nova de Cacela, Vila Real de Santo António)
- Praia da Luz (Luz, Lagos)
- Praia da Manta Rota (Vila Real de Santo Antonio)
- Praia da Mareta (Vila do Bispo)
- Praia da Marinha (Caramujeira, Lagoa)
- Praia da Meia Praia (Lagos)
- Praia da Oura (Albufeira e Olhos de Água, Albufeira)
- Praia da Pipa (Aljezur, Aljezur)
- Praia da Ponta da Piedade (Lagos)
- Praia da Ponta Ruiva (Vila do Bispo)
- Praia da Quebrada (Aljezur)
- Praia da Quinta do Lago (Loulé)
- Praia da Rocha (Portimão, Portimão)
- Praia da Rocha Baixinha (Albufeira e Olhos de Água, Albufeira)
- Praia das Adegas (Odeceixe, Aljezur)
- Praia da Salema (Budens, Vila do Bispo)
- Praia da Samouqueira (Aljezur)
- Praia das Belharucas (Albufeira)
- Praia das Furnas (Vila do Bispo)
- Praia da Sítio da Fábrica (Vila Nova de Cacela, Vila Real de Santo António)
- Praia das Quatro Águas (Tavira (Santa Maria e Santiago), Tavira)
- Praia das Salamitras (Albufeira)
- Praia das Velhas (Vila do Bispo)
- Praia da Terra Estreita (Santa Luzia, Tavira)
- Praia da Vigia (Albufeira)
- Praia de Adão e Eva (Monte Gordo, Vila Real de Santo António)
- Praia de Adegas (Odeceixe, Aljezur)
- Praia de Albandeira (Lagoa, Lagoa)
- Praia de Armacao de Pera (Silves)
- Praia de Arrifes (Albufeira)
- Praia de Aveiros (Albufeira)
- Praia de Beliche (Vila do Bispo)
- Praia de Benagil (Lagoa, Lagoa)
- Praia de Cabanas de Tavira (Conceição e Cabanas de Tavira, Tavira)
- Praia de Cabanas Velhas (Vila do Bispo)
- Praia de Cacela Velha (Vila Nova de Cacela, Vila Real de Santo António)
- Praia de Carvoeiro (Carvoeiro, Lagoa)
- Praia de Dona Ana (Lagos)
- Praia de Faro (Faro)
- Praia de Ferragudo (Lagoa)
- Praia de Joao de Arens (Portimao)
- Praia de Jose Vaz (Vila do Bispo)
- Praia de Maria Luisa (Albufeira)
- Praia de Monte Clérigo (Aljezur)
- Praia de Monte Gordo (Monte Gordo, Vila Real de Santo António)
- Praia de Nossa Senhora da Rocha (Porches, Lagoa)
- Praia de Odeceixe (Aljezur)
- Praia de Odeceixe Mar (Odeceixe, Aljezur)
- Praia de Quarteira (Loulé)
- Praia de Samouqueira (Rogil, Aljezur)
- Praia de Santa Eulalia (Albufeira)
- Praia de São Rafael (Albufeira e Olhos de Água, Albufeira)
- Praia de Vale de Lobo (Loulé)
- Praia de Vale dos Homens (Aljezur)
- Praia de Vale Figueira (Bordeira, Aljezur)
- Praia de Vale Figueiras (Aljezur)
- Praia de Vilamoura (Loulé)
- Praia de Vila Real de Santo António (Vila Real de Santo António, Vila Real de Santo António)
- Praia do Alvor (Portimao)
- Praia do Amado (Bordeira, Aljezur)
- Praia do Ancao (Loulé)
- Praia do Barranco (Lagoa)
- Praia do Barranco (Vila do Bispo)
- Praia do Barranco das Belharucas (Albufeira e Olhos de Água, Albufeira)
- Praia do Barranquinho (Lagoa)
- Praia do Barril (Santa Luzia, Tavira)
- Praia do Burgau (Budens, Burgau, Vila do Bispo)
- Praia do Cabeço (Castro Marim, Castro Marim)
- Praia do Canal (Aljezur, Aljezur)
- Praia do Canavial (Lagos)
- Praia do Carvalho (Carvoeiro, Lagoa)
- Praia do Castelejo (Vila do Bispo)
- Praia do Castelo (Albufeira e Olhos de Água, Albufeira)
- Praia do Evaristo (Albufeira e Olhos de Água, Albufeira)
- Praia do Garrao (Loulé)
- Praia do Homem Nu (Luz de Tavira e Santo Estêvão, Tavira])
- Praia do Inatel (Albufeira)
- Praia do Lacém (Conceição e Cabanas de Tavira, Tavira)
- Praia do Levante (Lagoa)
- Praia do Martinhal (Vila do Bispo)
- Praia do Mato (Lagoa)
- Praia do Mirouco (Vila do Bispo)
- Praia do Molhe (Ferragudo, Lagoa)
- Praia do Monte Clérigo (Aljezur, Aljezur)
- Praia do Murracao (Vila do Bispo)
- Praia do Penedo (Aljezur, Aljezur)
- Praia do Pinhao (Lagos)
- Praia do Pintadinho (Ferragudo, Lagoa)
- Praia do Porto de Mos (Lagos)
- Praia dos Alemães (Albufeira)
- Praia dos Arrifes (Albufeira e Olhos de Água, Albufeira)
- Praia dos Aveiros (Albufeira)
- Praia dos Caneiros (Ferragudo, Lagoa)
- Praia dos Mouranitos (Vila do Bispo)
- Praia dos Pescadores (Albufeira e Olhos de Água, Albufeira)
- Praia dos Pinheiros (Lagos)
- Praia dos Rebolinhos (Vila do Bispo)
- Praia dos Tesos (Olhao)
- Praia dos Tremocos (Lagoa)
- Praia do Telheiro (Vila do Bispo)
- Praia do Tonel (Vila do Bispo)
- Praia do Trafal (Loulé)
- Praia do Túnel (Albufeira e Olhos de Água, Albufeira)
- Praia do Vale de Centeanes (Carvoeiro, Lagoa)
- Praia do Vale dos Homens (Rogil, Aljezur)
- Praia do Zavial (Vila do Bispo)
- Praia Fluvial do Pego Fundo (Alcoutim)
- Praia Grande (Ferragudo, Lagoa)
- Praia Grande (Silves)
- Praia Manuel Lourenco (Albufeira)
- Praia Nova (Porches, Lagoa)
- Praia Olhos de Agua (Albufeira)
- Praia Rocha Baixinha Leste (Albufeira)
- Praia Salgados (Albufeira)
- Praia Santa Eulália (Albufeira e Olhos de Água, Albufeira)
- Praia Verde (Castro Marim, Castro Marim)
- Prainha (Portimao)

== Azores ==
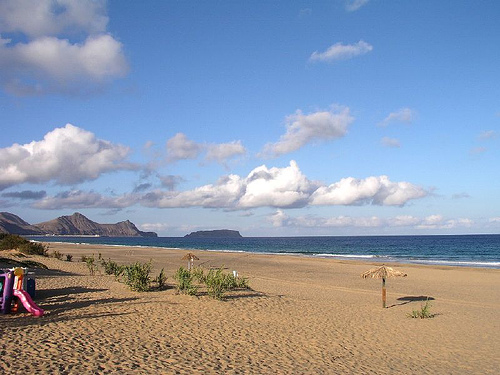
A view of the beach of Porto Santo in Madeira

== Madeira ==
=== Calheta ===
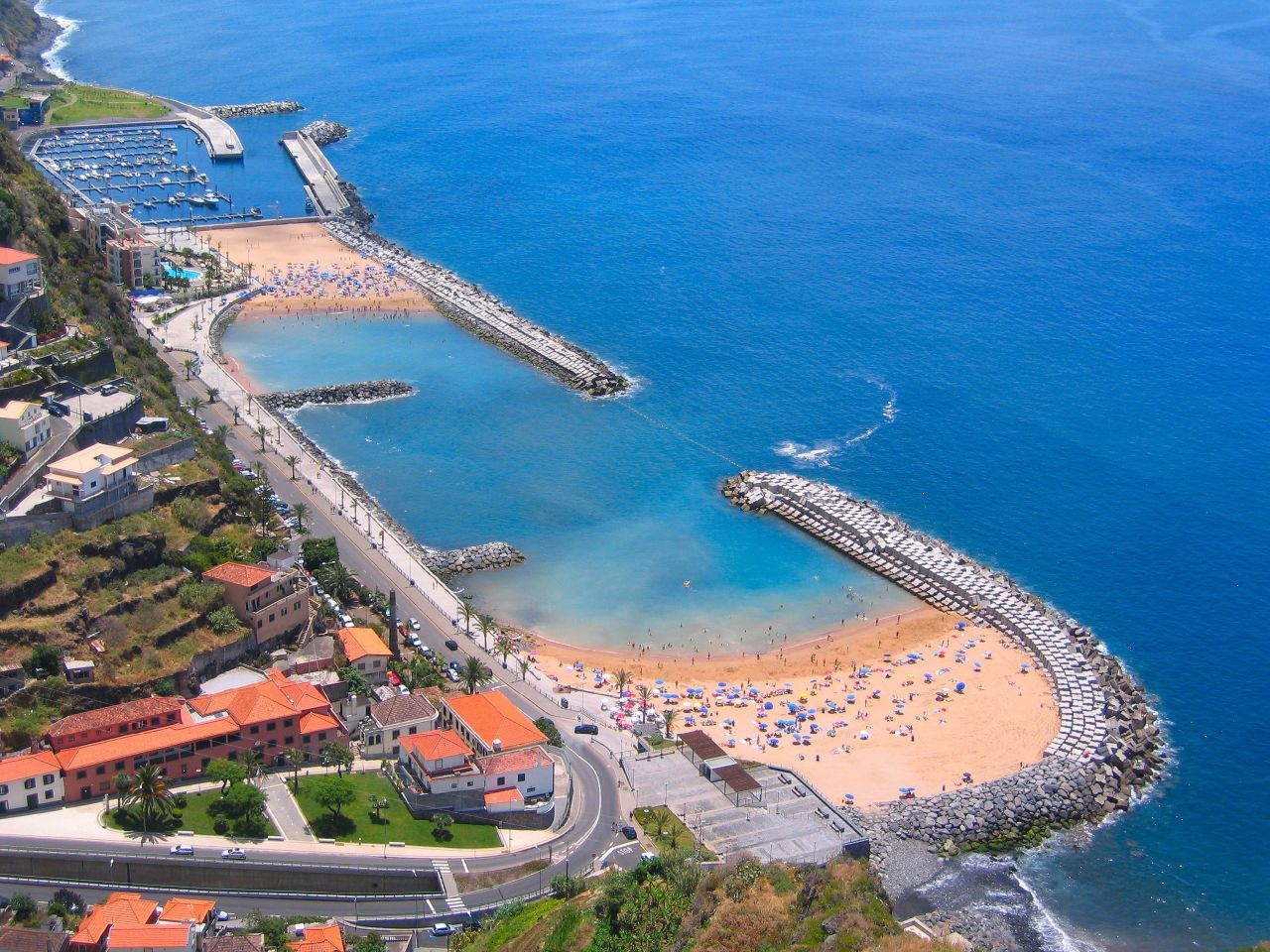
Praia da Calheta

- Praia da Calheta

=== Funchal ===
- Praia da Barreirinha
- Praia da Formosa
- Praia das Poças do Gomes
- Praia das Poças do Governador
- Praia de São Tiago
- Praia do Areeiro

- Praia do Clube Naval
- Praia do Gorgulho
- Praia do Lido
- Praia dos Namorados
- Praia Formosa
- Praia Nova

=== Machico ===
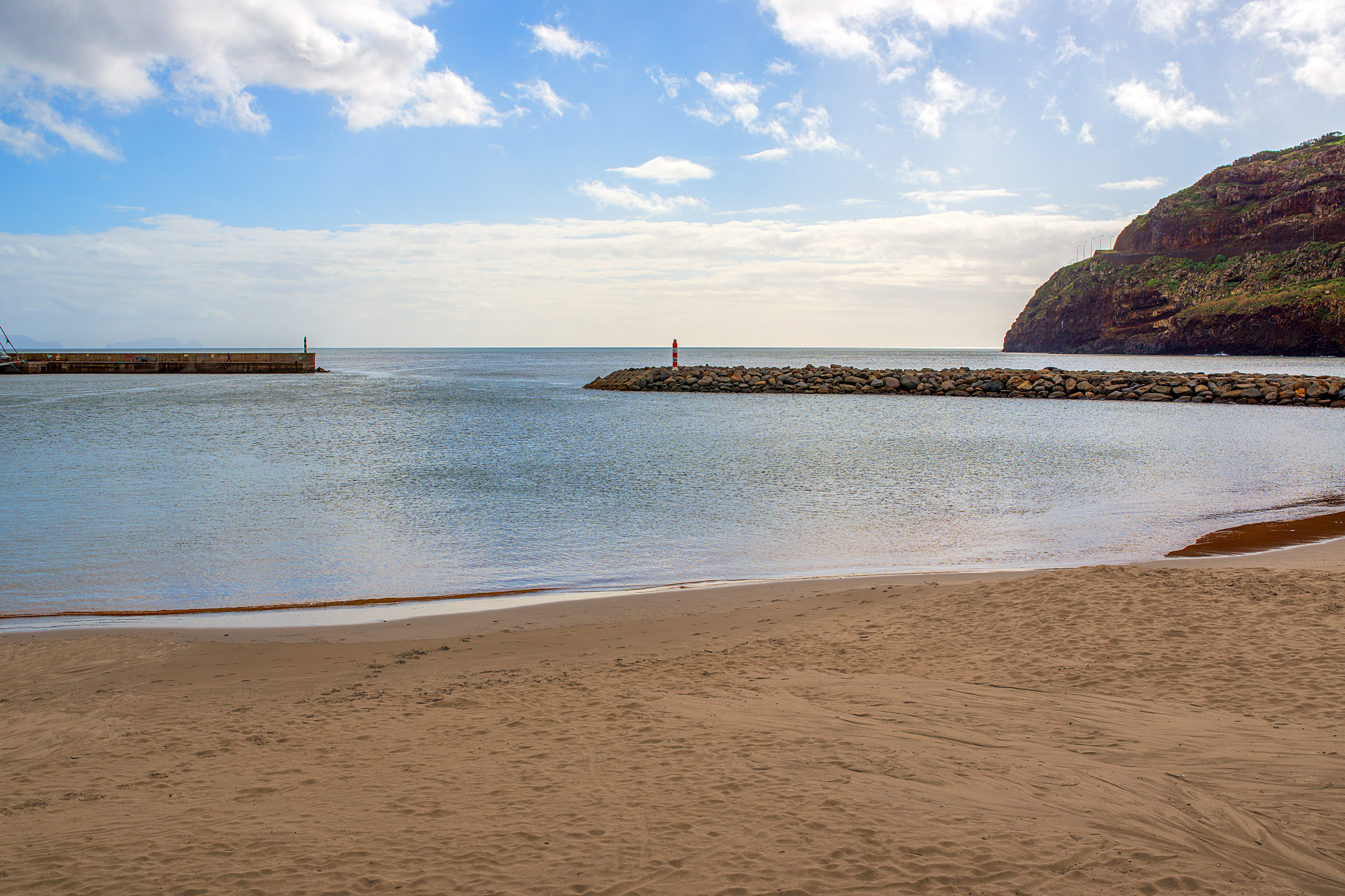
Praia de Machico

- Praia da Banda de Além
- Praia da Ribeira do Natal
- Praia de Machico

=== Ponta do Sol ===
- Praia da Madalena do Mar
- Praia da Ponta do Sol

=== Porto Moniz ===
- Praia da Laje
- Praia de Porto Moniz

=== Porto Santo ===
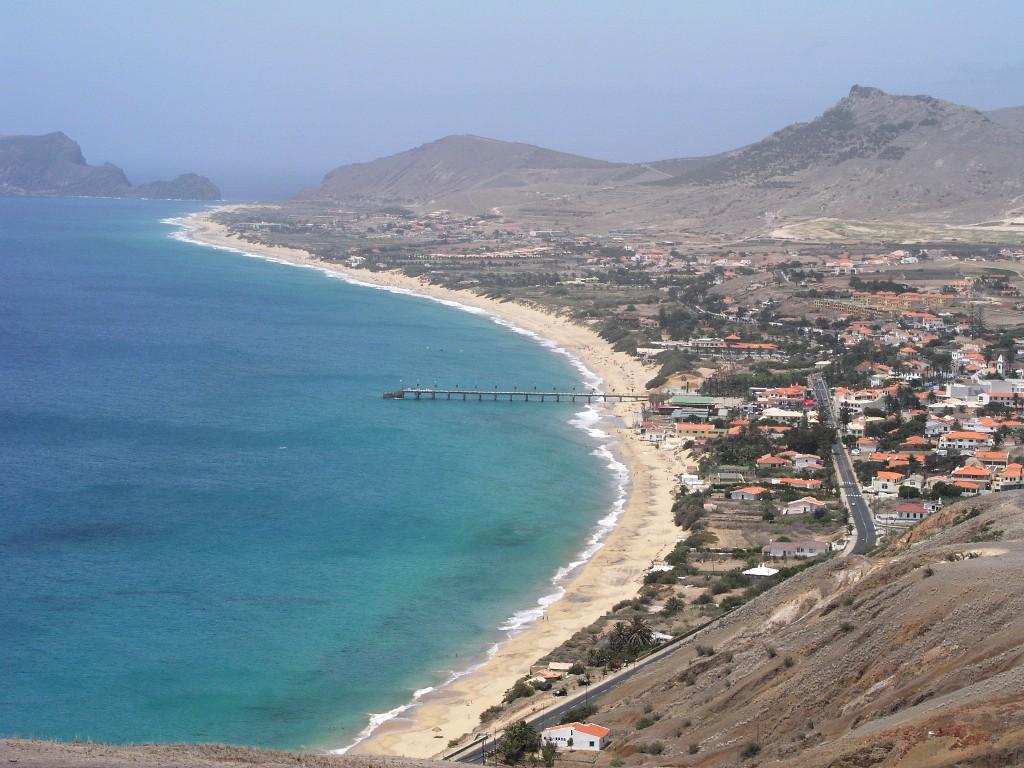
Praia do Porto Santo.

- Praia da Fontinha
- Praia de Porto Santo
- Praia do Porto das Salemas
- Praia do Porto dos Padres
- Praia do Zimbralinho

=== Ribeira Brava ===
- Praia da Ribeira Brava

=== Santa Cruz ===
- Praia da Roca Mar
- Praia das Palmeiras
- Praia de São Fernando
- Praia do Galo Mar
- Praia dos Reis Magos

=== Santana ===
- Praia da Foz da Ribeira do Faial
- Praia do Calhau de São Jorge
