= Praia da Coelha =

Beach in Albufeira, Portugal

- Beach
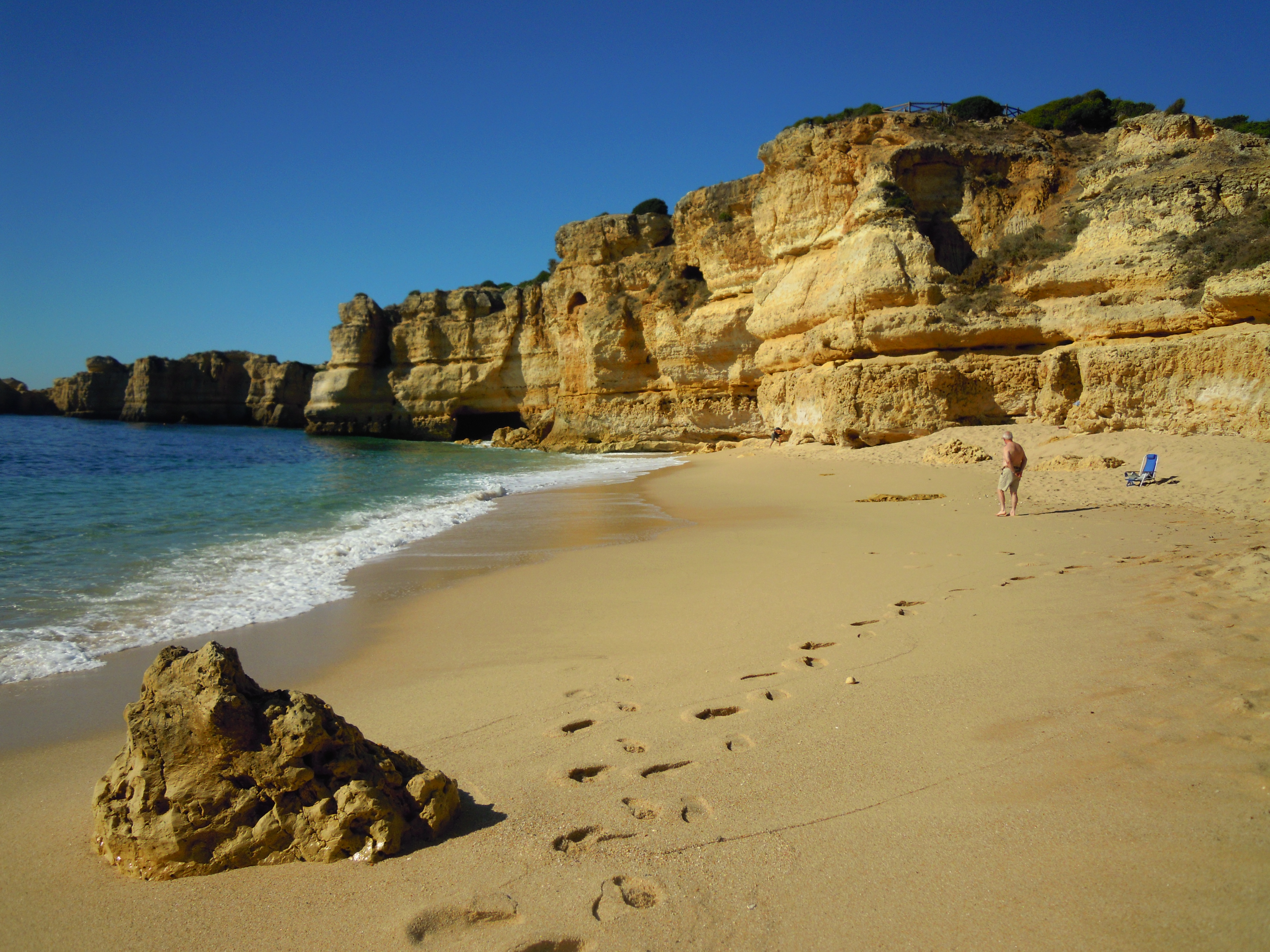
- Praia da Coelha

- Location within Portugal
- Coordinates: 37°4′25.51″N 8°17′37.38″W
- Location: Albufeira, Algarve, Portugal

Praia da Coelha (English: Rabbit Beach) is a beach close to the village resort of Sesmarias which is within the Municipality of Albufeira, in the Algarve, Portugal. This beach is located 3.9 miles (6.3 km) by road to the west of Albufeira old town centre and is 31.5 miles (50.7 km) west of the region's capital, Faro. This beach is one of 69e blue flag beaches (2012) in the Algarve

== Description ==
Praia da Coelha is situated south of the resort village of Sesmarias between Albufeira and Armação de Pêra. To access the beach requires a short walk along a footpath from the car park, which passes through olive trees, ancient carob trees and bamboo groves. At the end of the footpath the beach is reached down a paved ramp with wooden steps leading down to the sand. During the "beach season", there is also a raised board walk running west towards a small beach bar and restaurant which has toilets and a shower; these are also accessible from the paved ramp before accessing the beach. The cove has fine golden sand and some rock formations. To the back of the beach there are cliffs which are subject to erosion and it is recommended that care be taken whilst below as there is a possibility of falling rocks and stones. The restaurant and bar are usually open from mid-March until early November every year, and the beach facilities including a lifeguard service, sunbeds and sunshades etc., and a masseuse providing therapeutic massage services are available from the start of the defined "beach season" in the Algarve, normally from early April until the end of October/early November.

== Gallery ==
Praia da Coelha

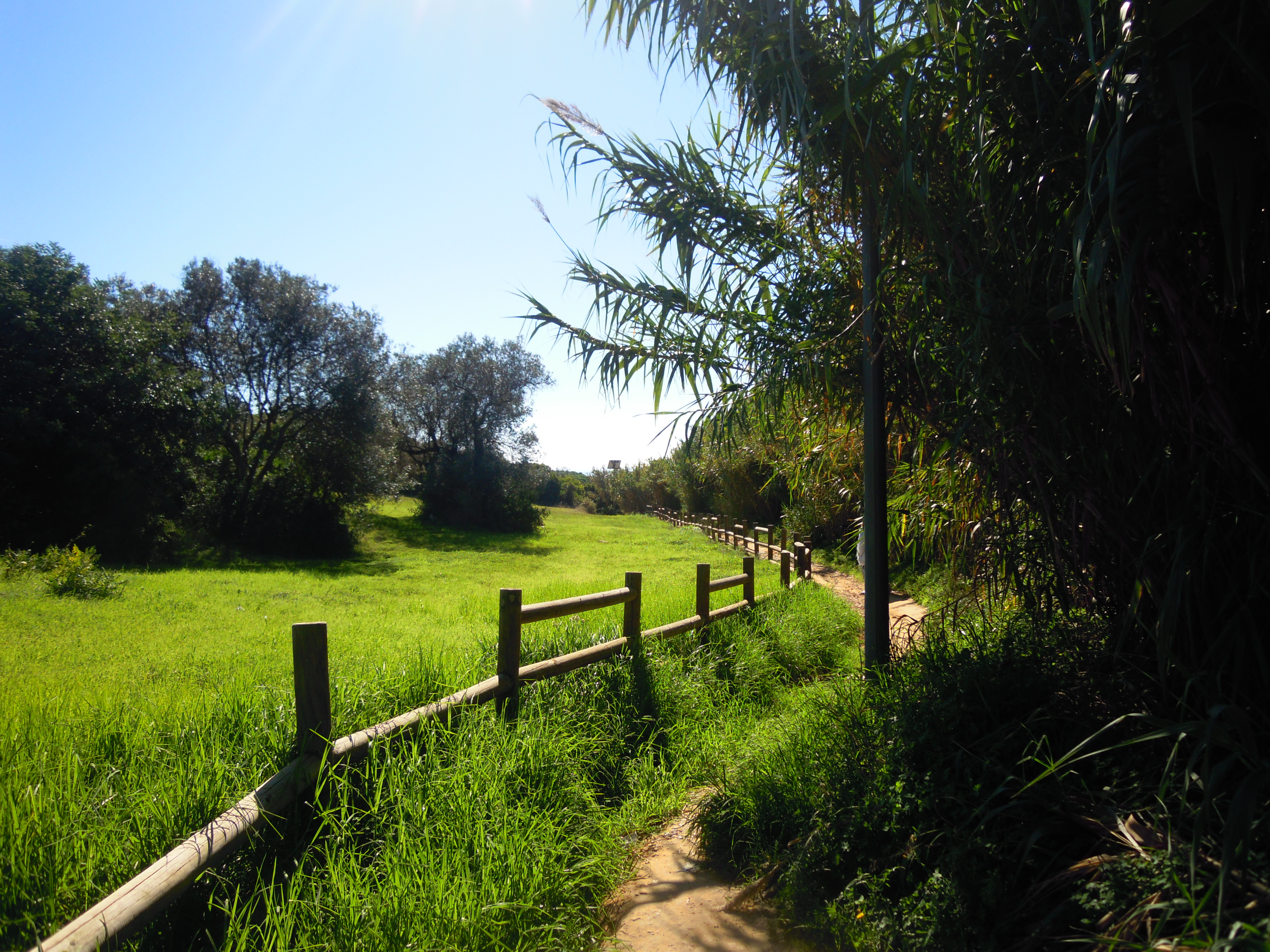
The footpath down to the cove

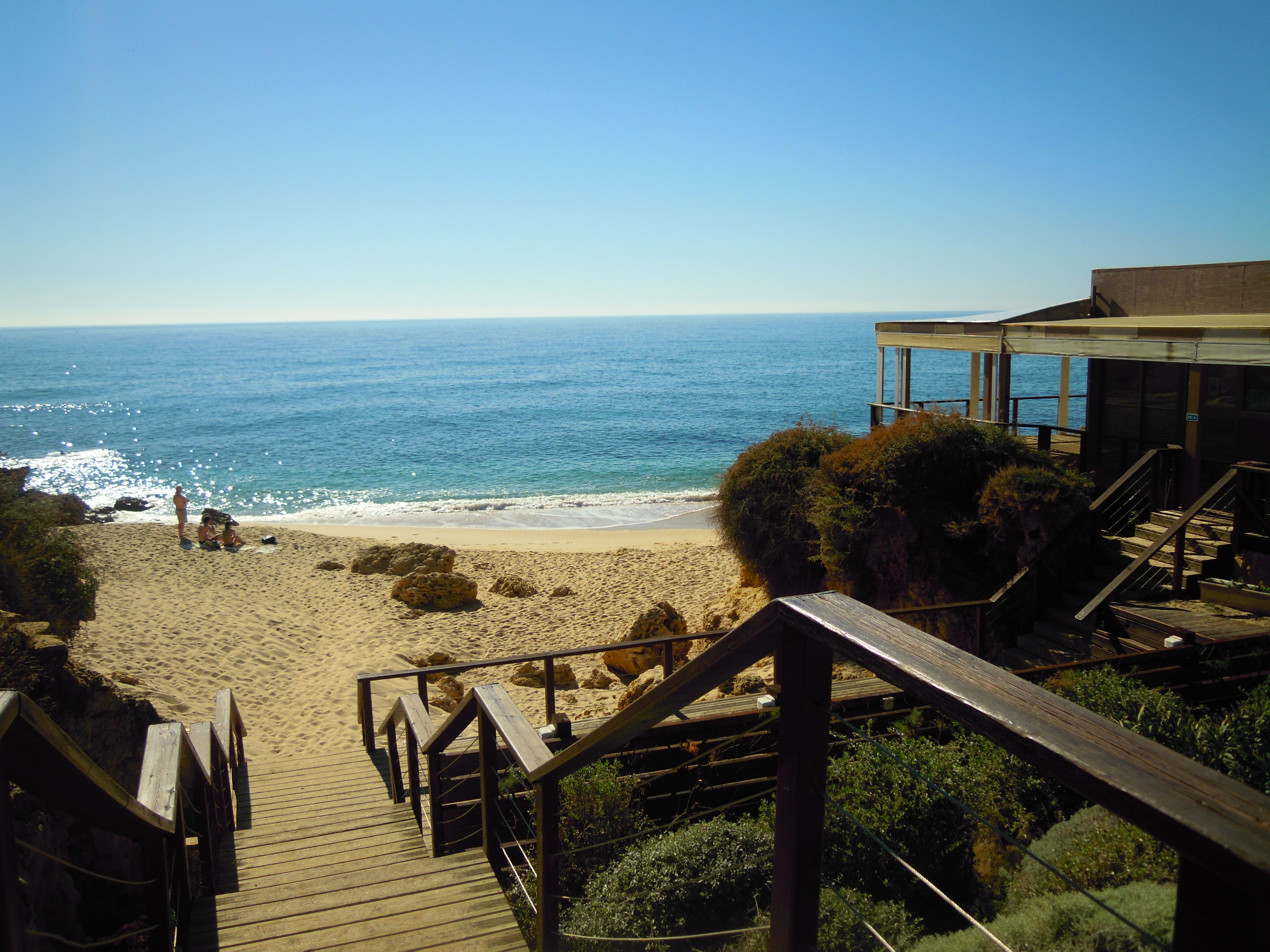
The steps down to the beach. The wooden board walk runs off to the beach bar and restaurant to the right.

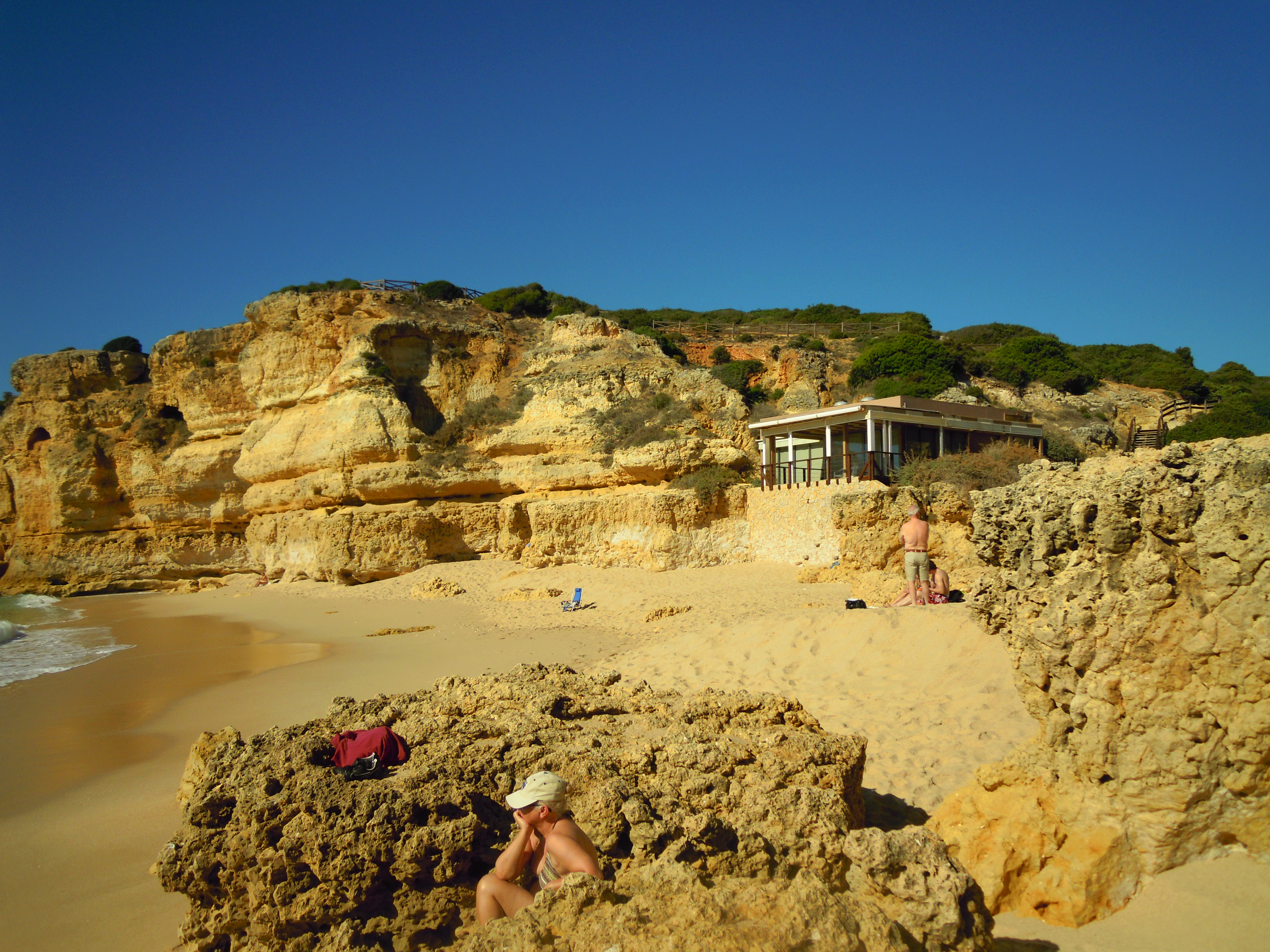
Cliffs and beach bar.

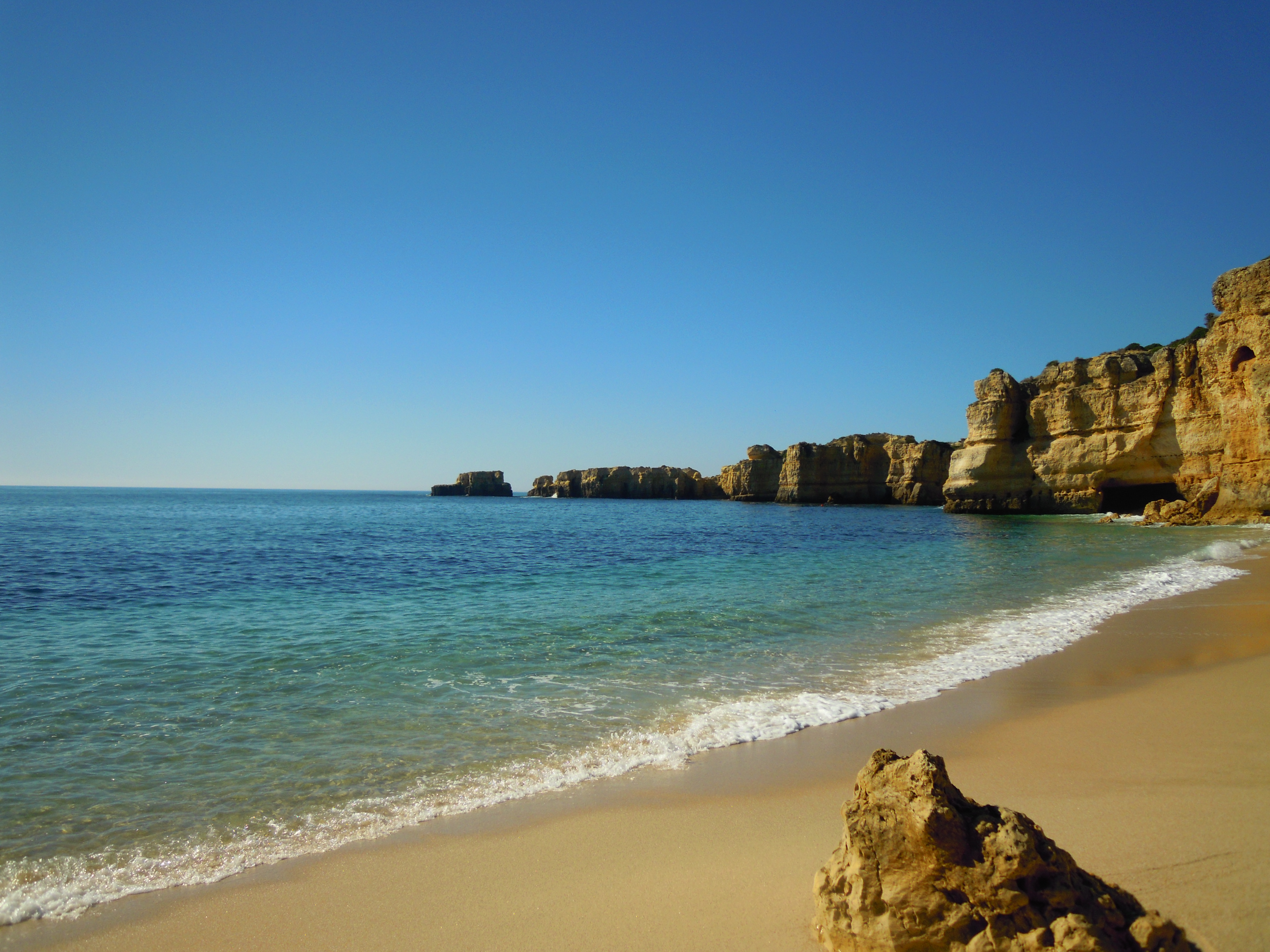
The view westwards from the beach.
