= Praia do Castelo =

Beach in Albufeira, Portugal

- Beach
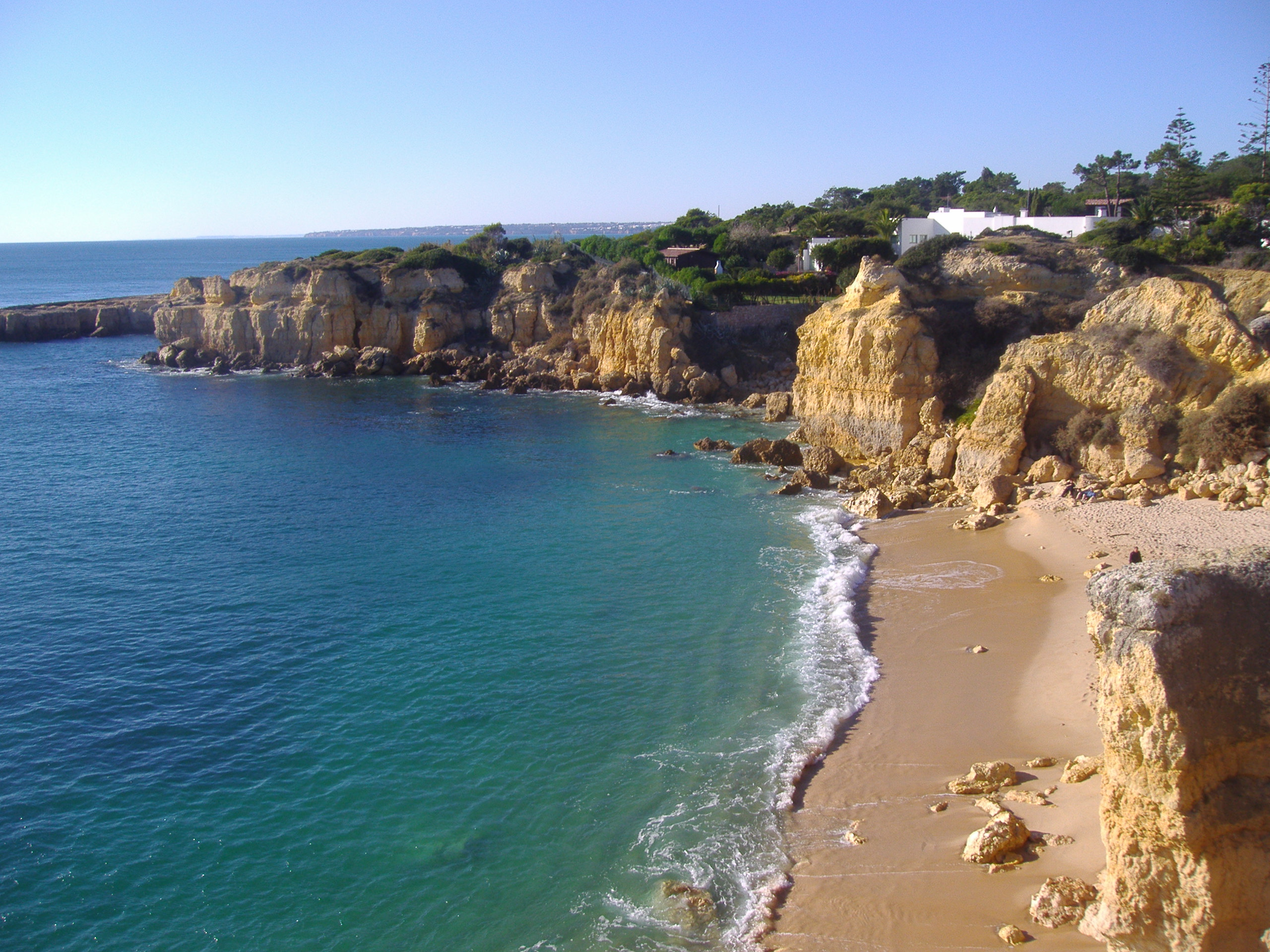
- Praia do Castelo

- Location of Praia do Castelo
- Coordinates: 37°4′23.59″N 8°17′55.17″W
- Location: Albufeira, Algarve, Portugal

Praia do Castelo is a beach close to the village resort of Sesmarias which is within the Municipality of Albufeira, in the Algarve, Portugal. This beach is located 4.0 miles (6.4 km) by road to the west of Albufeira old town centre and is 31.9 miles (51.3 km) west of the regions capital of Faro. This beach is one of sixty nine blue flag beaches (2012) in the Algarve.

== Description ==
Praia do Castelo or Castle Beach is in fact made up of one main beach and several small satellite beaches and coves. The main beach is small and made up of gold sand and is 200.00 metres (656.17 ft) long and is sheltered by 30 feet (9.1 m) high jagged cliffs. Spreading in each direction from the main beach are several small coves, interspersed by rocky outcrops. The beach gets its name from the Watchtower which once stood here. The watchtower was built in the mid-16th century to monitor this stretch of the coast for attacks by Barbary pirates coming from North Africa. The remains of this watchtower can be found close to the access point to the beach.

=== Access ===
On the cliff top there is a small car park which is reached from the resort village of Sesmarias along a small lane which is signposted Praia do Castelo with a brown Tourist sign (Rua da Torre Velha). From the car park the beach is reached by descending a set of wooden steps which also gives access to the beach bar and restaurant. The cliffs which back the beach are subject to erosion and it is recommended that great care be taken whilst below as there is a possibility of falling rocks and stones.

=== Facilities ===
There are toilets and a shower. During the summer season the beach is patrolled by lifeguards who also man a medical post. Also in the summer season there are Loungers, and parasols which can be hired. There is also a public telephone.

== Gallery ==
Praia do Castelo

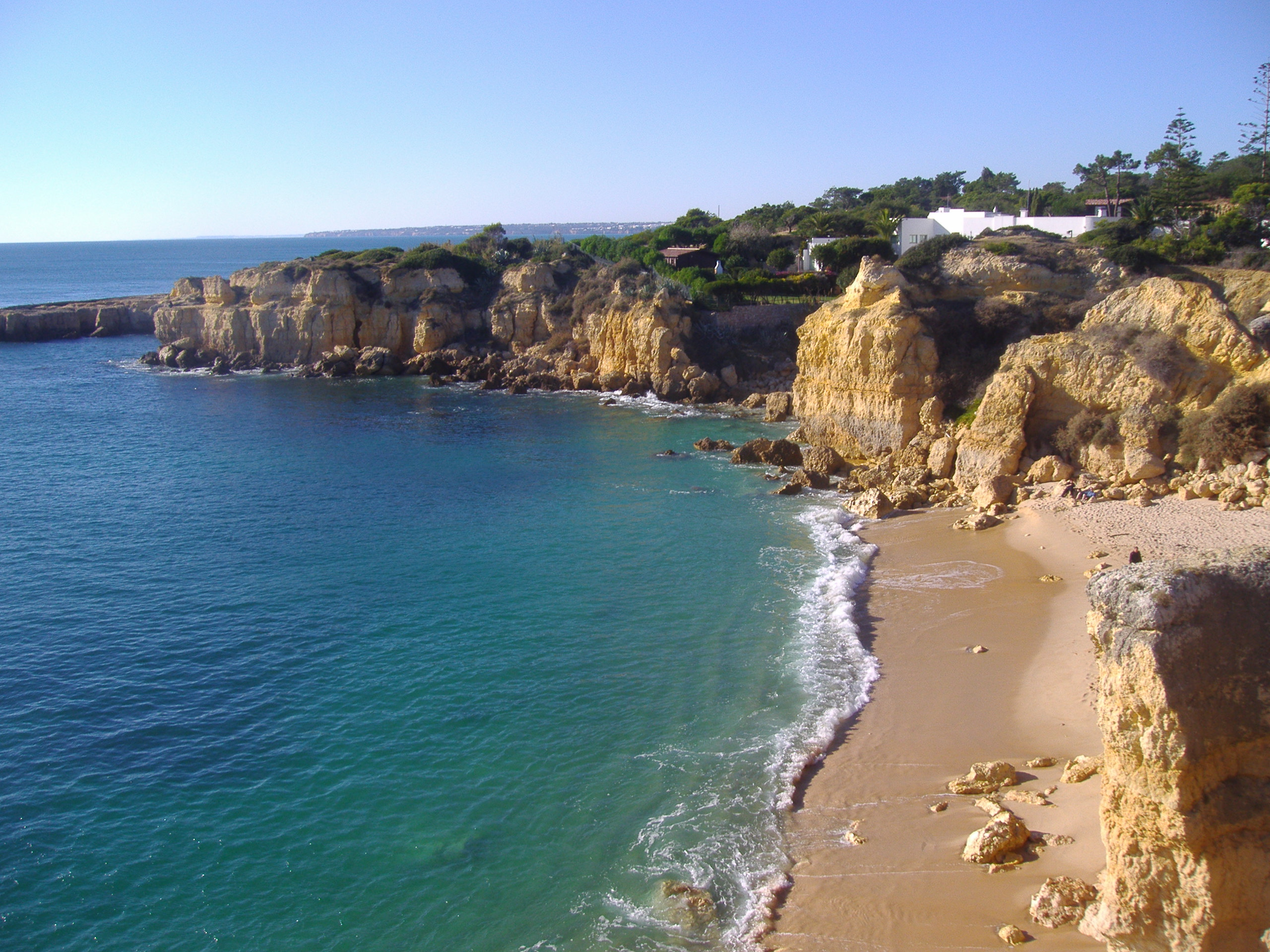
View to the west from the cliffs above Praia do Castelo.

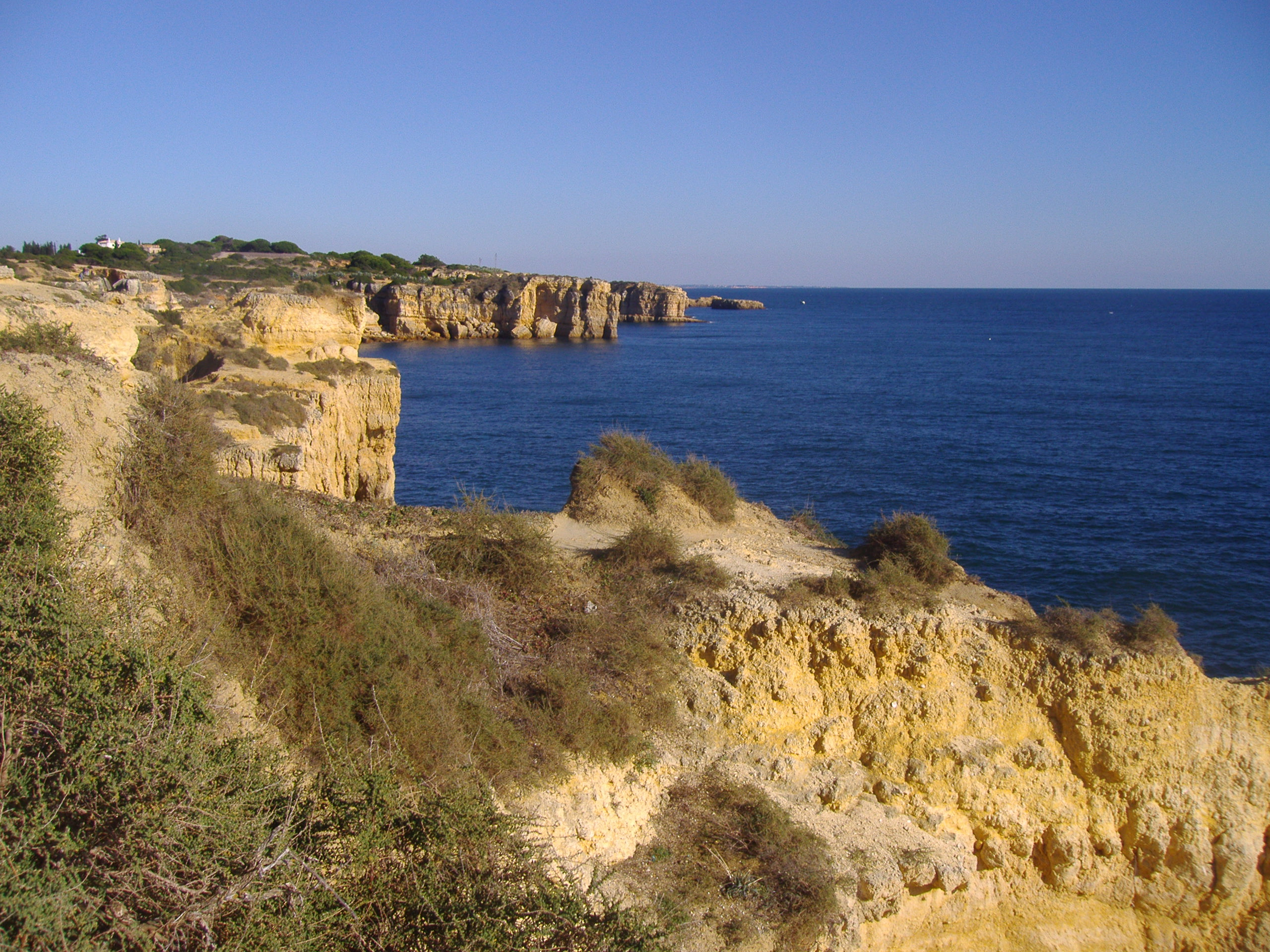
View to the east from the cliffs above Praia do Castelo.

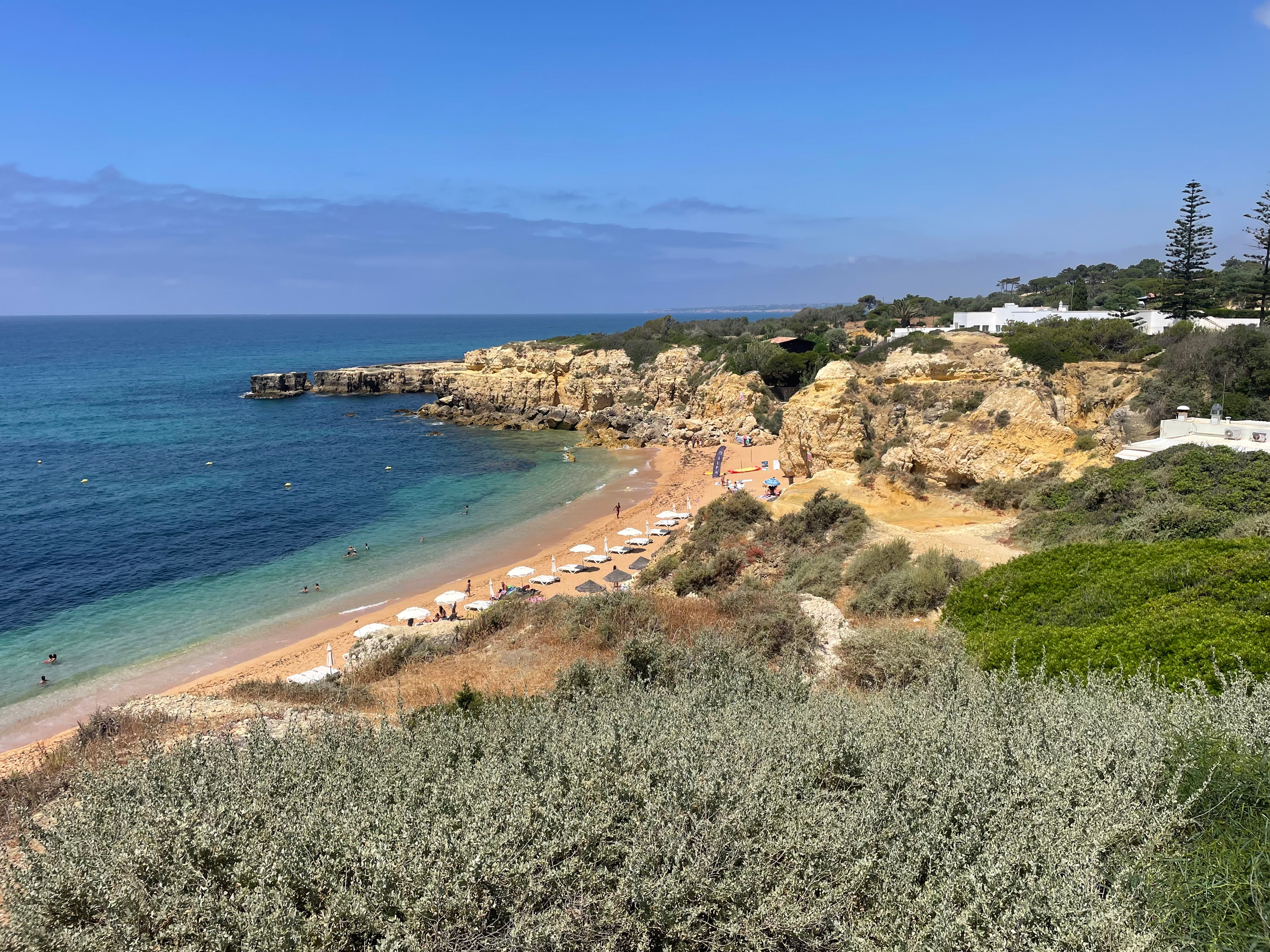
View of Praia do Castelo.

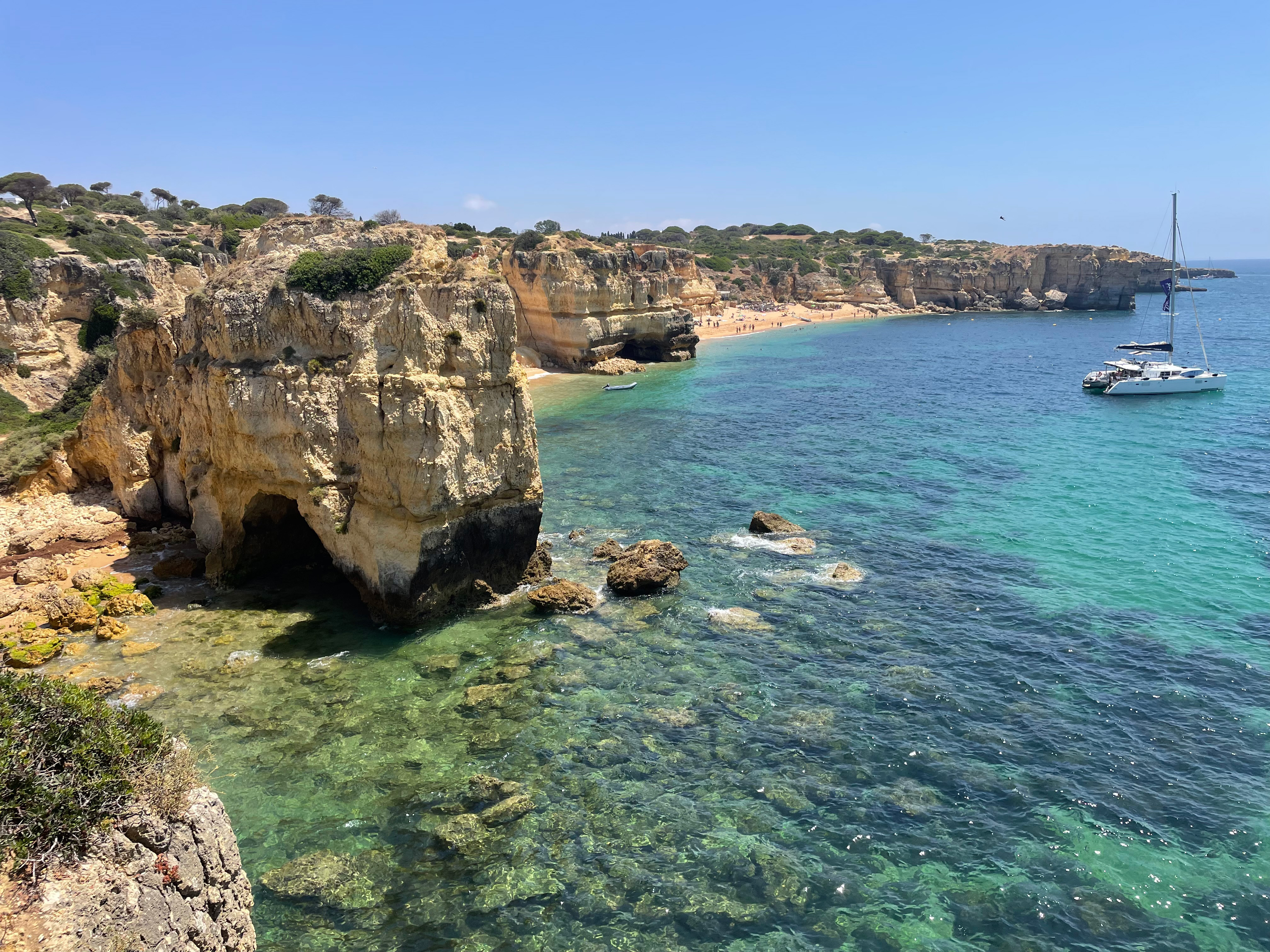
Cliffs near Praia do Castelo.
