= Olheiros de Água Doce =

The Olheiros de Água Doce is a beach in the Faro District of the Algarve Region on the southernmost coast of Portugal, in Olhos de Água.

There are many freshwater springs on the beach, visible during low tide when they bubble through the sand on the beach. The unusual springs were documented by Arab writers.

== Location ==
The Olheiros de Água Doce is near Olhos de Água Beach, east of the Barranco das Belharucas Beach.

== History ==
The springs have long been used by locals for drinking water and for washing clothes.

Today, they are referred to as Bulicame, which means "thermal fount" in Italian, thus tying the "Olheiros de Água Doce" to Genoese, Venetian, and Sicilian whalers and tuna fishermen. These people, during the Thirteenth, Fourteenth, and Fifteenth centuries, demanded the Algarve coast for their use, and went to Olhos de Água (i.e. the Bulicame that existed on the sand) for essential drinking water.

When the Moors were expelled from Iberia and started to cross the Algarve coast, this region was invaded by the people of North Africa, justifying the construction of a vast defensive system, including the Torre da Medronheira, the Fort of São João do Arade, and the Forte de Vale Longo (in Rocha Baixinha Beach), among others. The inhabitants of the nearby coastal villages moved further north, including the population near Olhos de Água Beach, who went on to found the current Boliqueime.

The Portuguese suffix "-queime" replace the fake Italian suffix "-came", thus expressing the sense of the "thermal" adjective.
