= Praia da Oura =

Beach in Albufeira, Portugal

- Beach
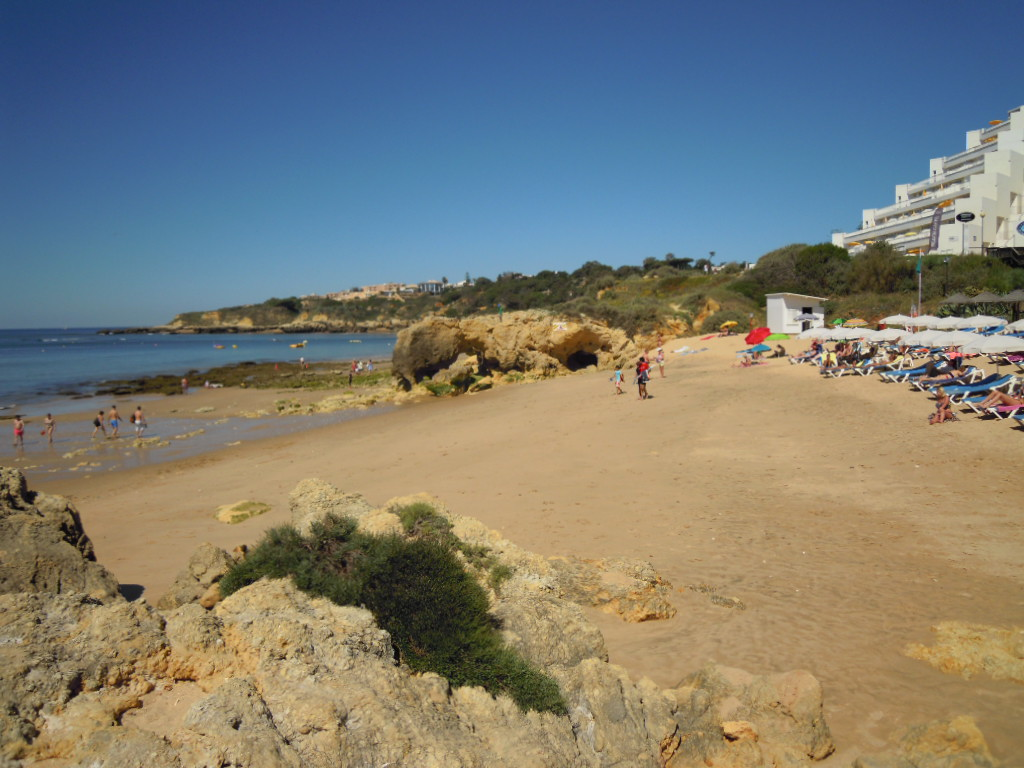
- Praia da Oura

- Location of Praia da Oura
- Coordinates: 37°5′06.9″N 8°13′20.8″W
- Location: Albufeira, Algarve, Portugal

Praia da Oura is a blue flag beach within the Municipality of Albufeira, in the Algarve, Portugal. The beach is in the eastern district of Albufeira in the neighbourhood called Areias de São João (Saint John's Sands). Its flanked by Praia dos Aveiros to the west and Praia de Santa Eulália to the eastern side. The beach is approximately 900 metres (3,000 ft) in length and is 450 metres (1,480 ft) wide at low tide.

== Description ==
The beach is in a small bay and has fine gold sand and some rock formations. The central section is very popular in the summer but the eastern end of the beach, also known as the Praia dos Bicos, is quieter and has less facilities. The rear cliffs at the eastern end feature some jagged rock formations called the Pedra dos Bicos and are topped with pine woodland with small meadows. The central and western end of the beach are dominated by several large beach resort developments and with a short promenade which runs across the back of this section of beach.

== Facilities ==
Parking close to the beach is limited and may prove difficult during the busy summer season. During the summer months the beach is patrolled by lifeguards. There are several licensed bar, restaurant concessions along the beach. there are toilet and shower facilities and there are opportunities to hire parasols and sun loungers.

== Commercial area ==
Praia da Oura has a commercial area to the rear of the middle of the beach in the Rua Ramalho Ortigao. The shops and business consist of beach shops, supermarket, popular bar cafes, restaurants, and hotels, many of which have views of the beach. There is also a public telephone.

== Gallery ==
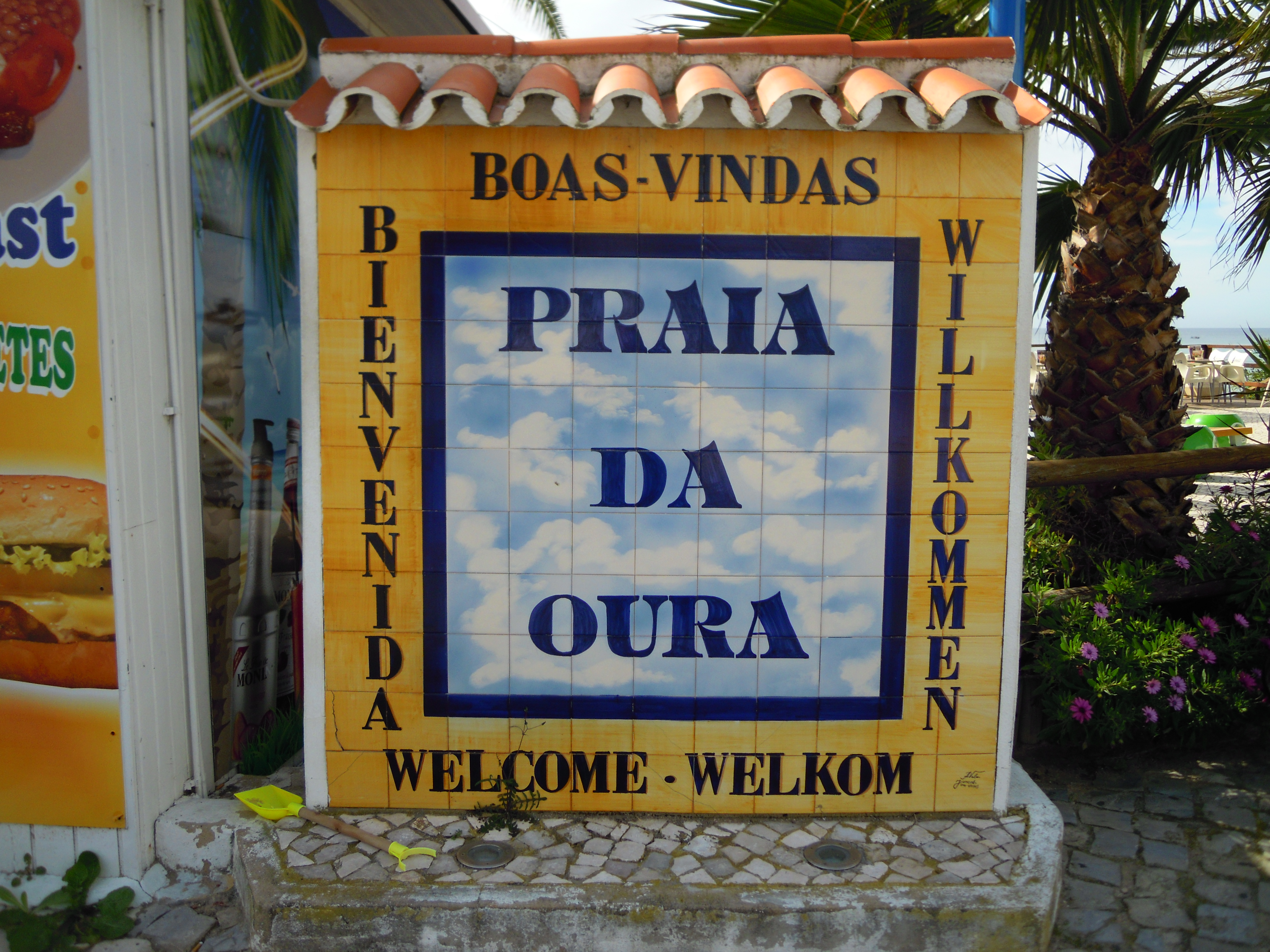
Welcome sign on the promenade to the rear of the beach

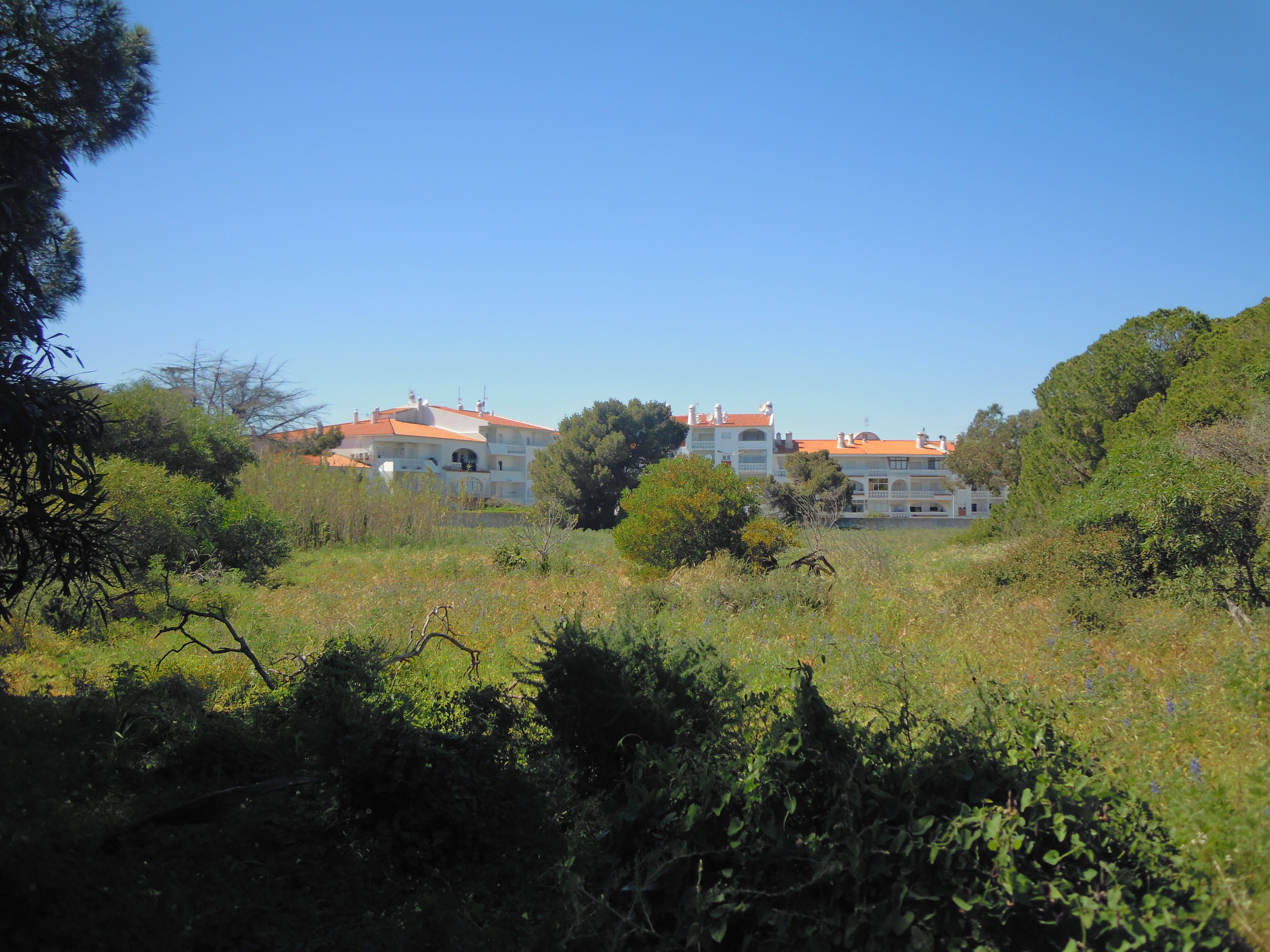
The pine woodland with and flower meadow at Pedra dos Bicos on the cliff tops above Praia da Oura.

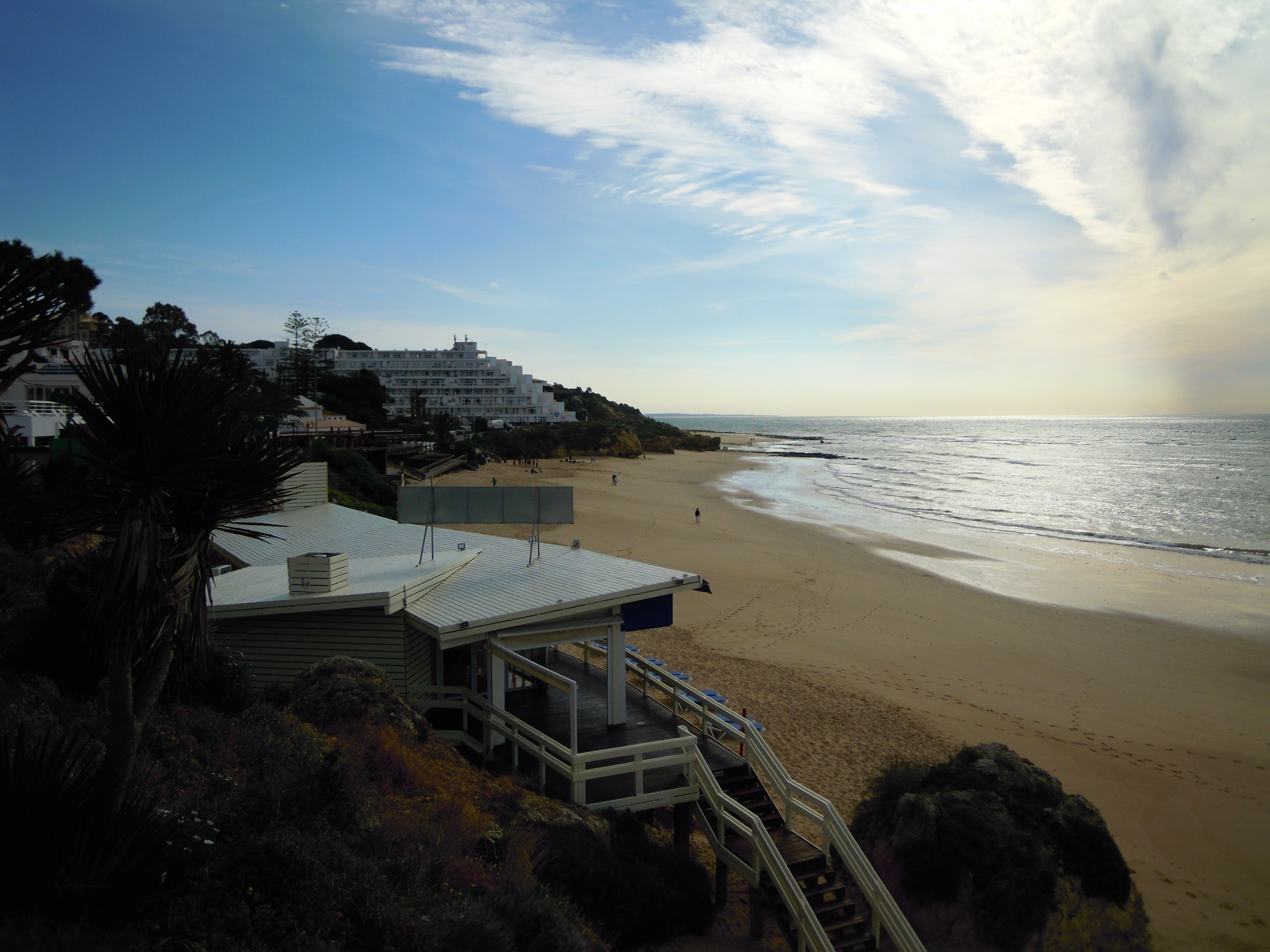
Looking along the beach towards the east

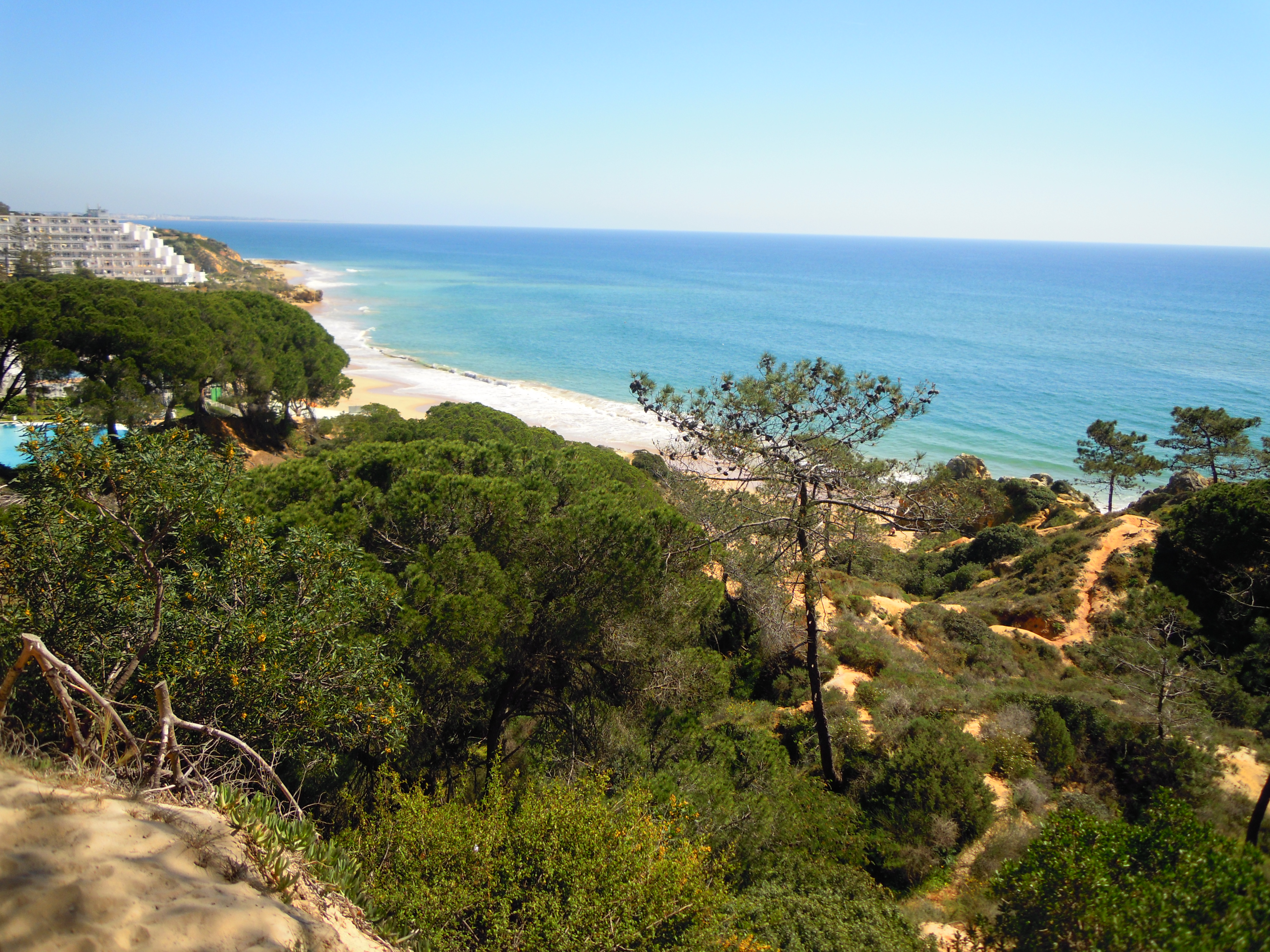
The cliff tops at the western end of Praia da Oura

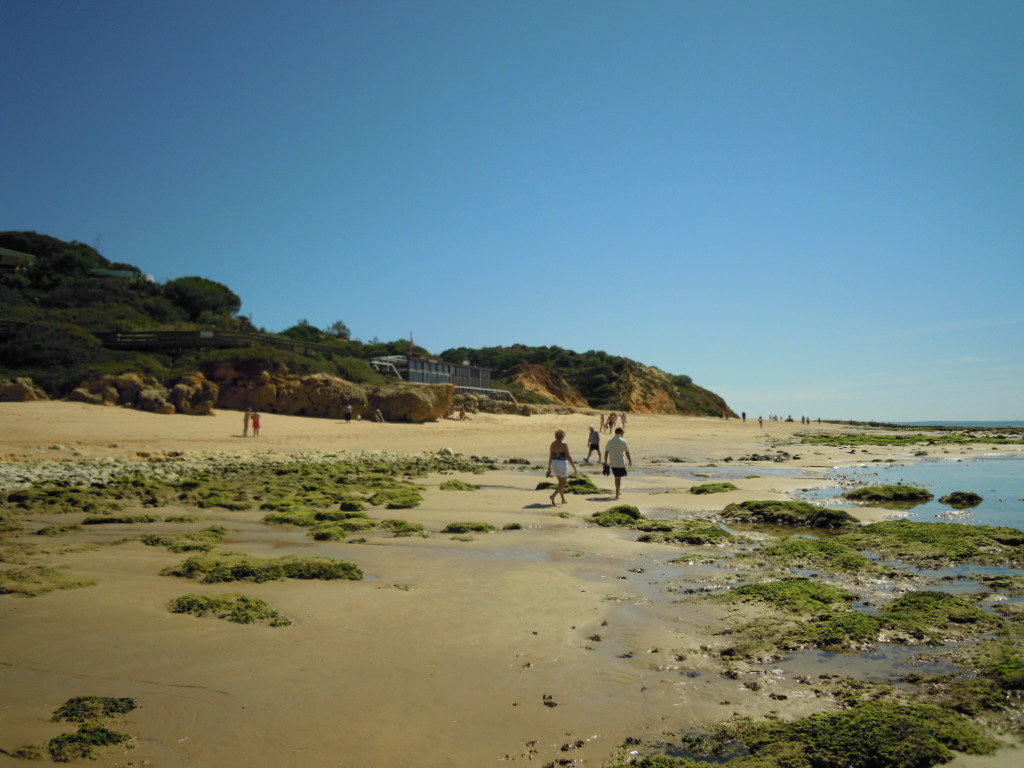
the eastern end of the beach is alternatively called Praia dos Bicos.

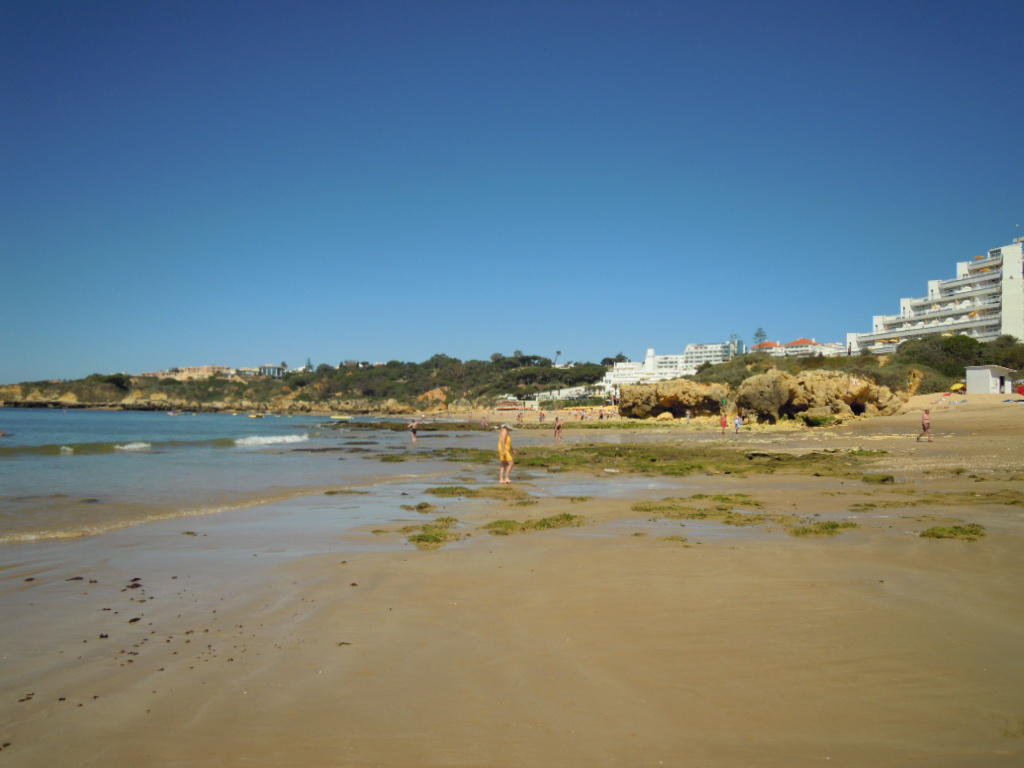
Looking west along the beach at low tide

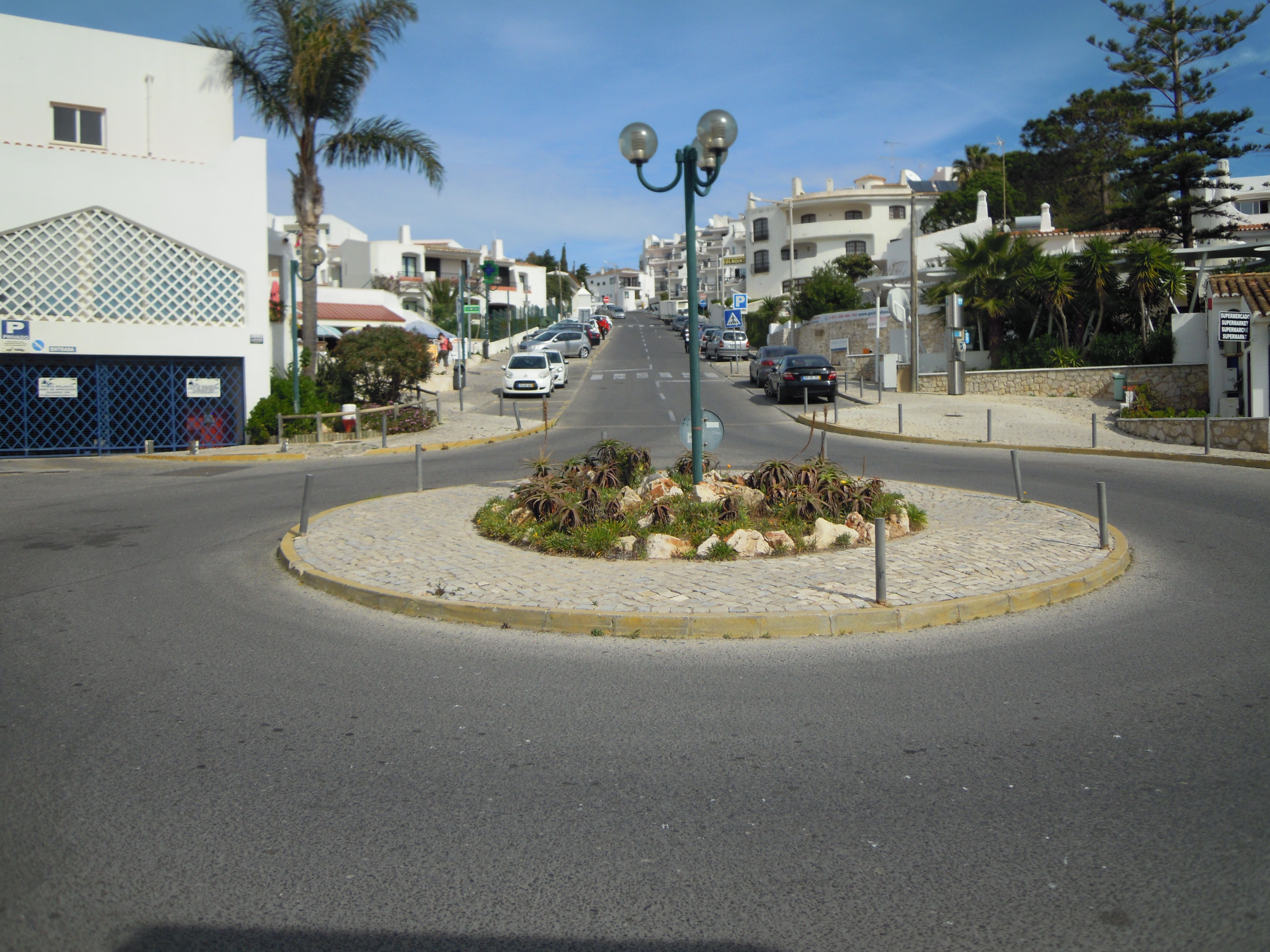
The small rounabout on the Rua Ramalho Ortigao, behind the middle section of the beach.

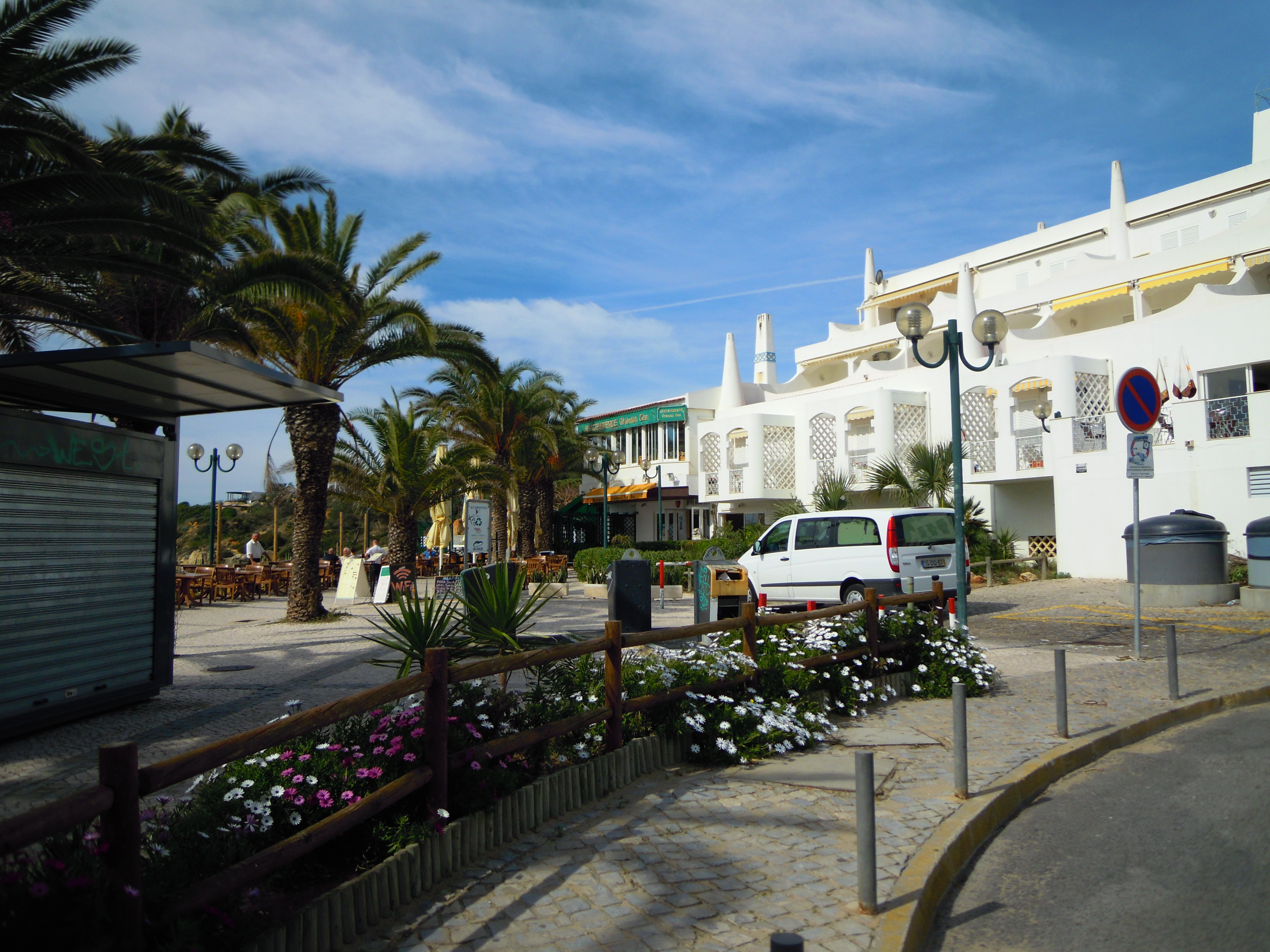
Part of the Commercial area on the Rua Ramalho Ortigao behind the middle section of Praia da Oura.
