= Praia da Carreagem =

Beach in Portugal

- Beach
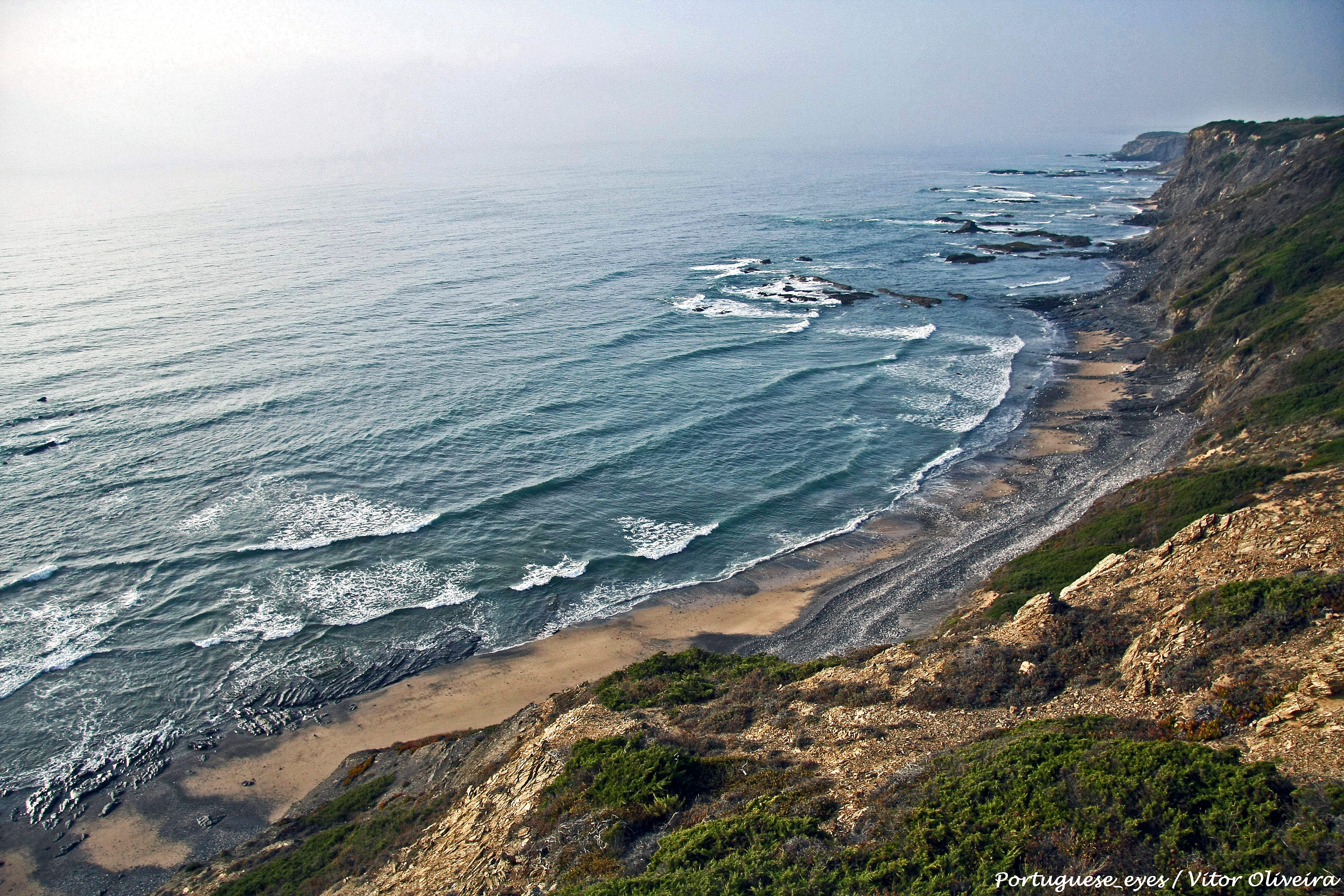
- Location of Praia da Carriagem in Portugal

- Praia da Carriagem
- Coordinates: 37°21′31″N 8°50′28″W
- Location: Aljezur, Algarve, Portugal

Praia da Carreagem (sometimes written Praia da Carriagem) is a beach within the Municipality of Aljezur, in the Algarve, Portugal. The beach is on the western Seaboard in the north west of the Algarve. The beach is 2.6 miles (4.2 km) west of the village of Rogil, and is 71.8 miles (115.6 km) north west, by road, from the regions capital of Faro. The beach is inside the Vicentine Coast Natural Park.

== Description ==
A secluded beach which is unspoiled and never busy and visitors to the beach must negotiate a marked pathway and steps which lead down to this beach from a car park on the cliff above. The beach has many interesting and unusual rock formations. The beach is popular for sports such as Kite surfing, Windsurfing, and bodyboard surfing. The sea here is designate with a Flag#Swimming flags is considered too dangerous for swimming.

== Gallery ==
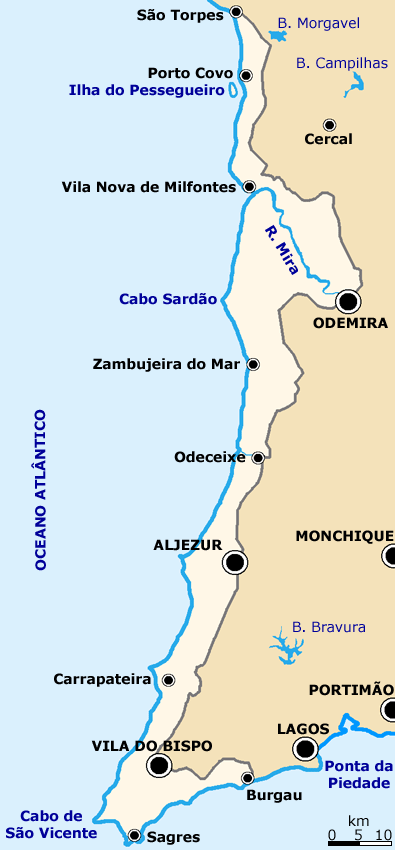
Map of the Vicentine Coast Natural Park

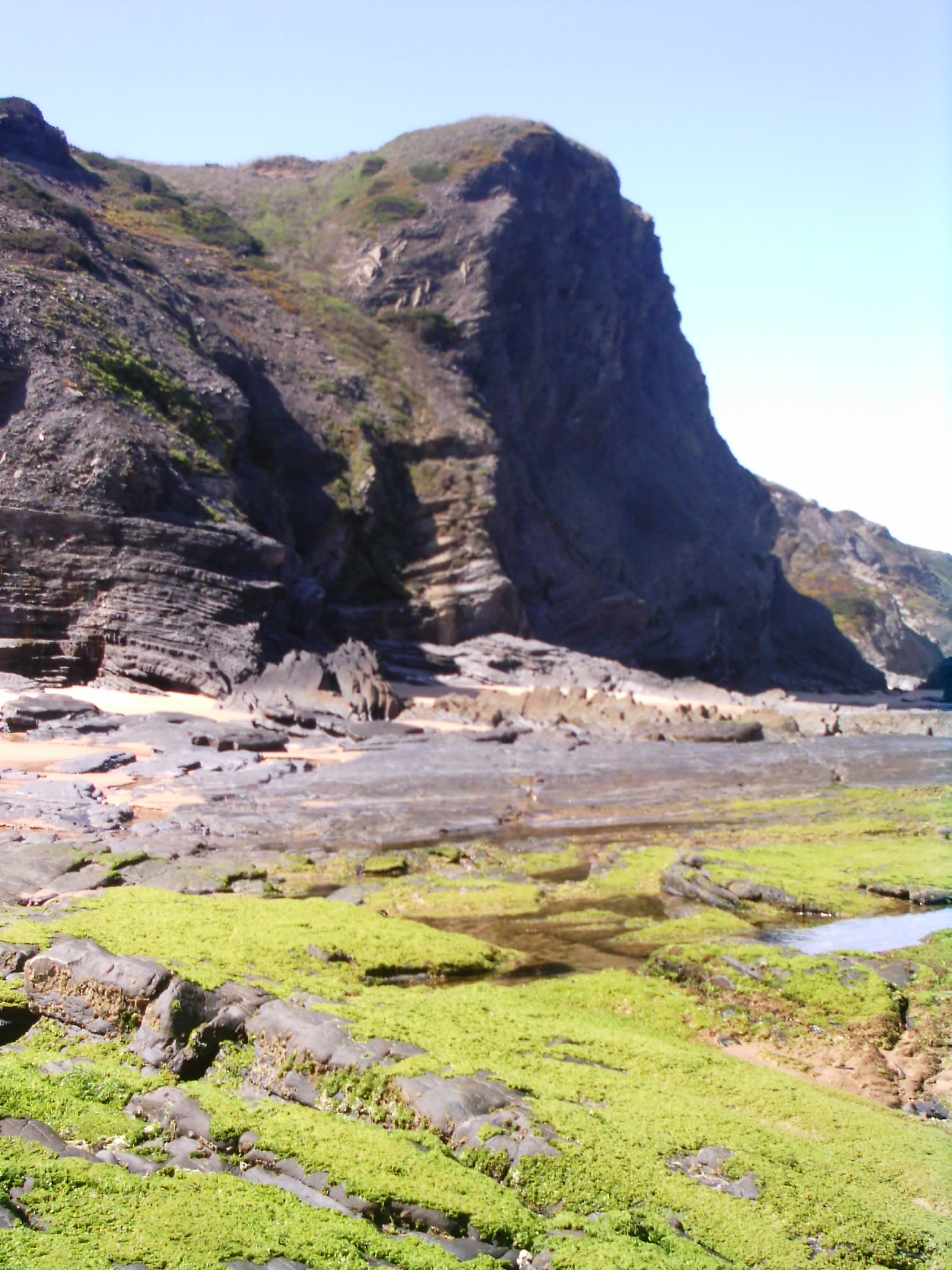

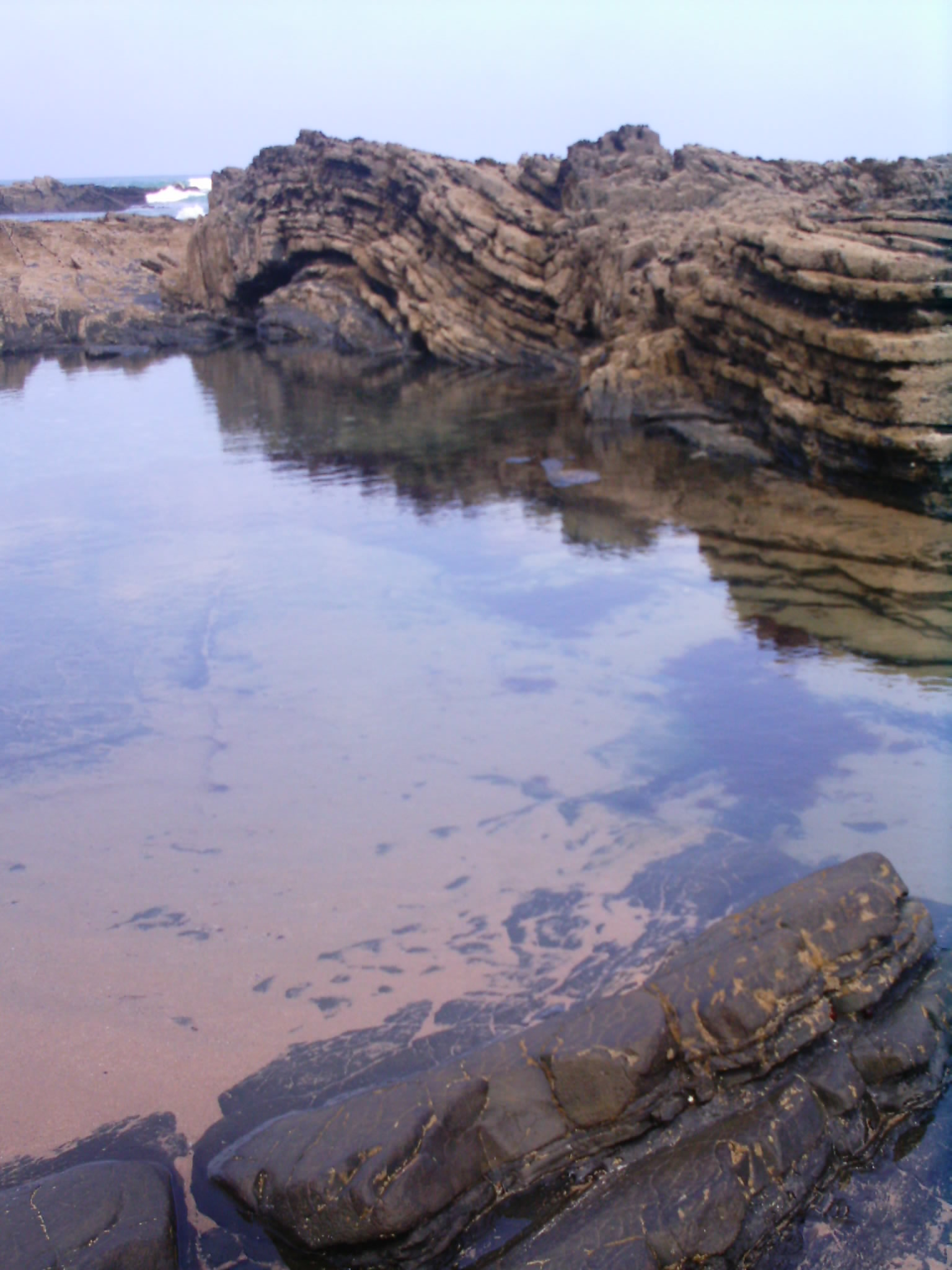
Rock Formations on Praia da Carreagem

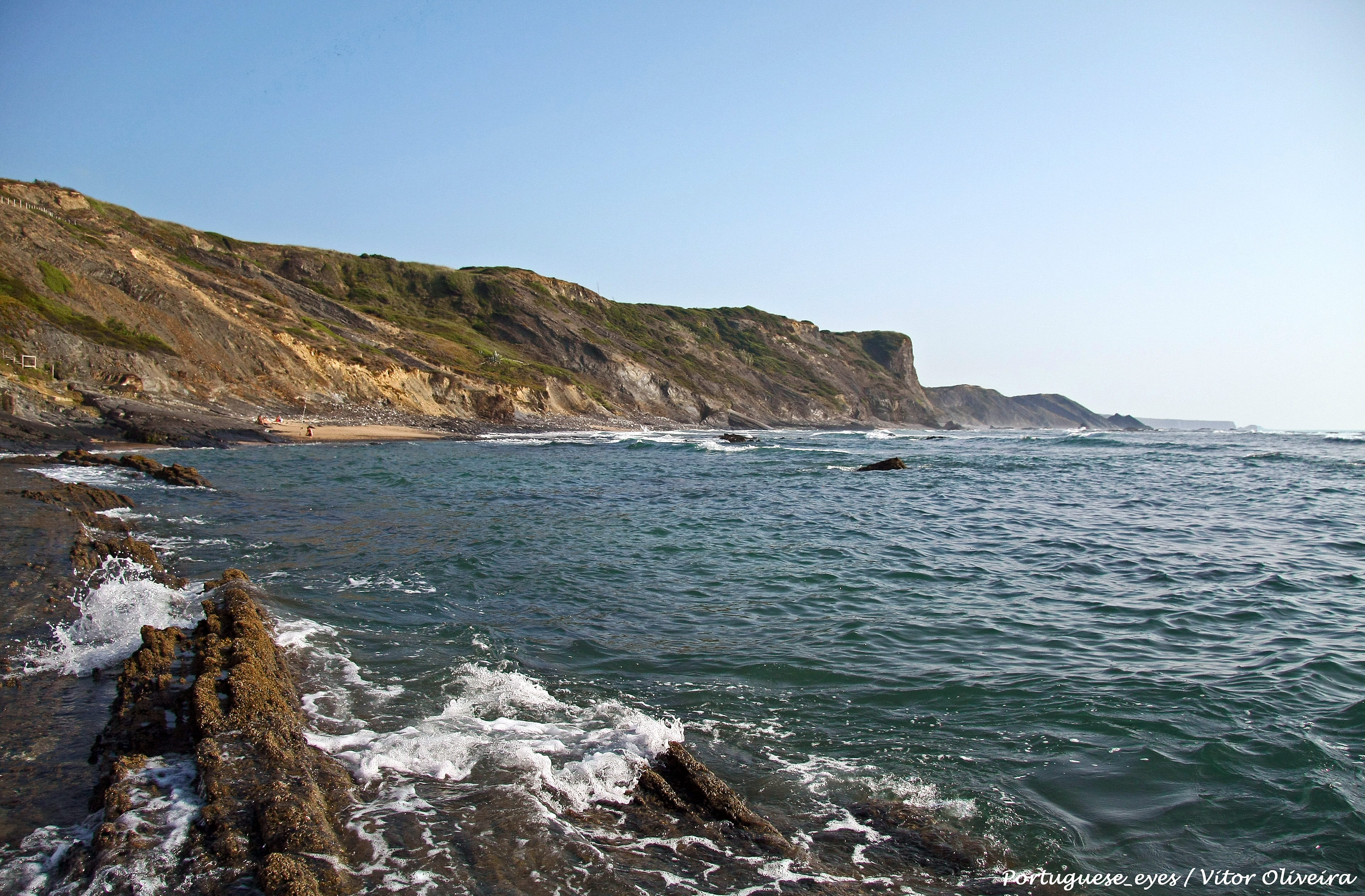

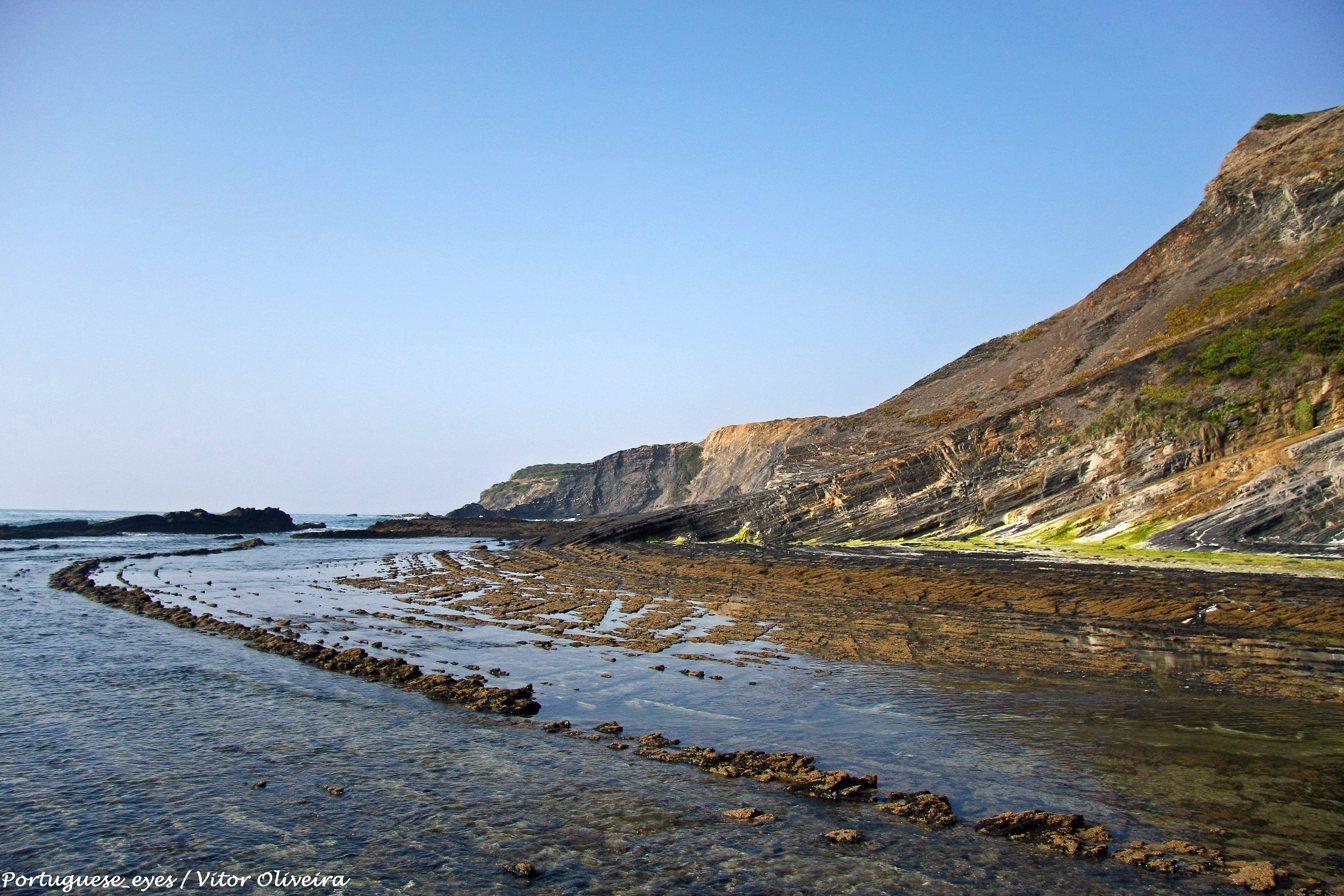

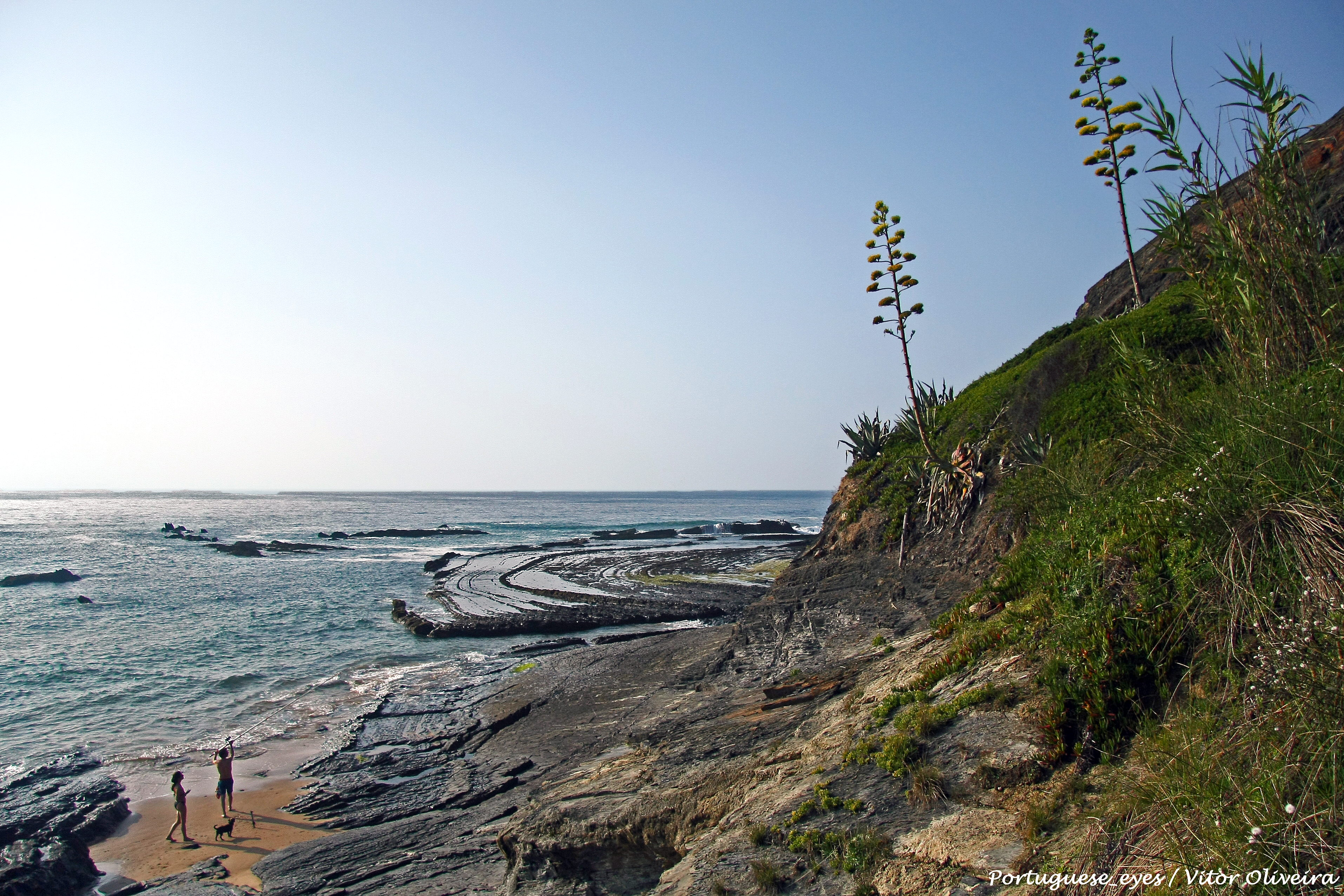
