= Praia de Samouqueira =

Beach in Aljezur, Portugal

- Beach
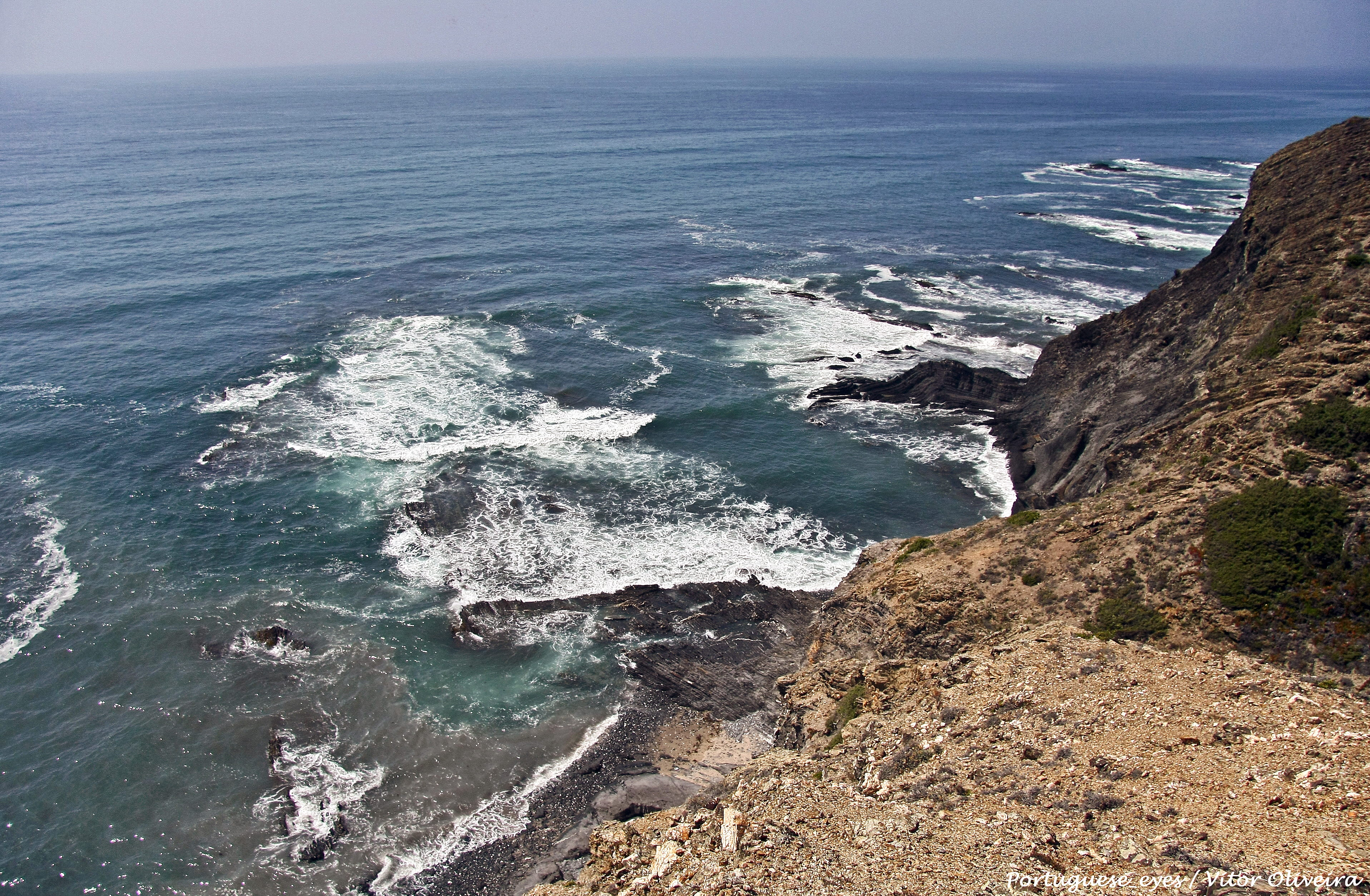
- Praia de Samouqueira

- Location of Praia de Samouqueira
- Coordinates: 37°24′22″N 8°48′46″W
- Location: Aljezur, Algarve, Portugal

Praia da Samouqueira a beach within the Municipality of Aljezur, in the Algarve, Portugal. The beach is on the western Seaboard in the extreme north west of the Algarve. The beach is 2.3 miles (3.7 km) north west of the village and municipality of Rogil, and is 73 miles (117 km) north west, by road, from the regions capital of Faro.

== Description ==
The beach of Praia da Samouqueira is a small secluded beach which is unspoiled and never busy. The beach is made up of sand with areas of gravel and rocky outcrops. It is an ideal place to come and enjoy the natural surroundings.

== Getting there ==
From the EN120 road at the north end of the village of Rogil turn left down a small tarmac road (Estrada da Esteveira). Stay on this road till you reach Esteveira. From the end of the tarmac road at the oval turning point, follow the unpaved lane ignoring the forks until you reach the coast. The beach is then reached by a small trail which is steep in places and can prove difficult.

== Gallery ==
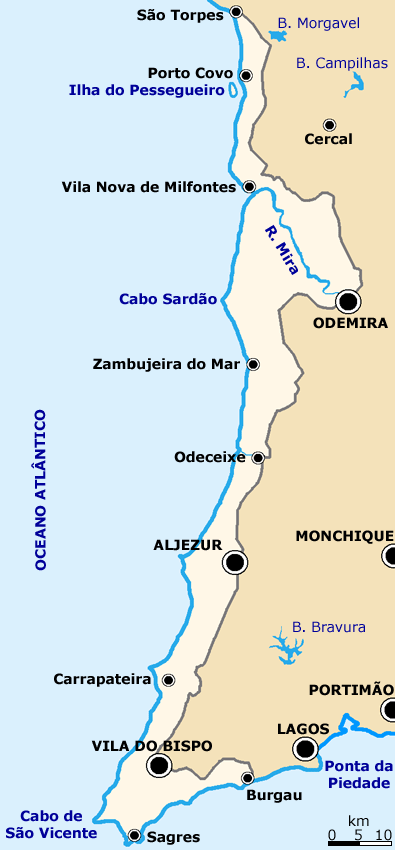
Map of the Vicentine Coast Natural Park
