= Ponte de Aljezur =

Bridge of Aljezur Ponte de Aljezur
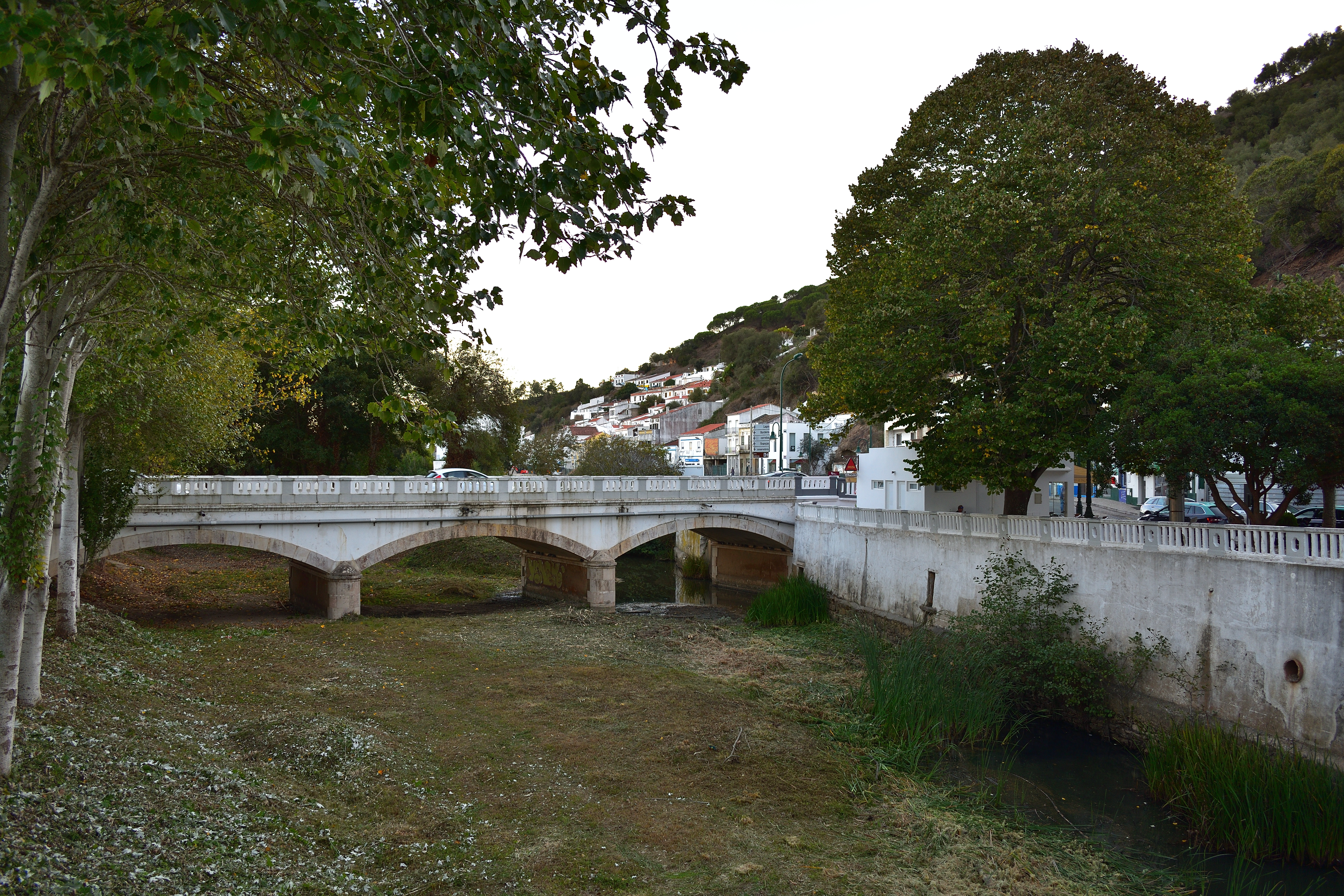
- View of the bridge
- Coordinates: 37.316655°N 8.803261°W
- Carried: vehicles, pedestrians
- Crossed: Ribeira de Aljezur
- Locale: Portugal, Aljezur, Aljezur
- Official name: Ponte de Aljezur
- Heritage status: Included in the Nature Park of Southwest Alentejo and St. Vincent Coast; partially included in the sector plan of Natura 2000 Network (Habitats 3290 and 6420)
- Followed by: Medieval bridge

Characteristics
- Total length: 39 metres (128 ft)
- Width: 6 metres (20 ft)

History
- Designer: unknown
- Construction start: Middle Ages
- Opened: 18th century
- Collapsed: 4 March 1947

Statistics
- Daily traffic: Aljezur, EN120/Rua 25 de Abril; Largo do Mercado; Largo da Liberdade

Location
- Interactive map of Bridge of Aljezur

The Ponte de Aljezur (Bridge of Aljezur) is a bridge located over the Ribeira de Aljezur, in the civil parish of Aljezur, municipality of Aljezur, in the Portuguese district of Faro.

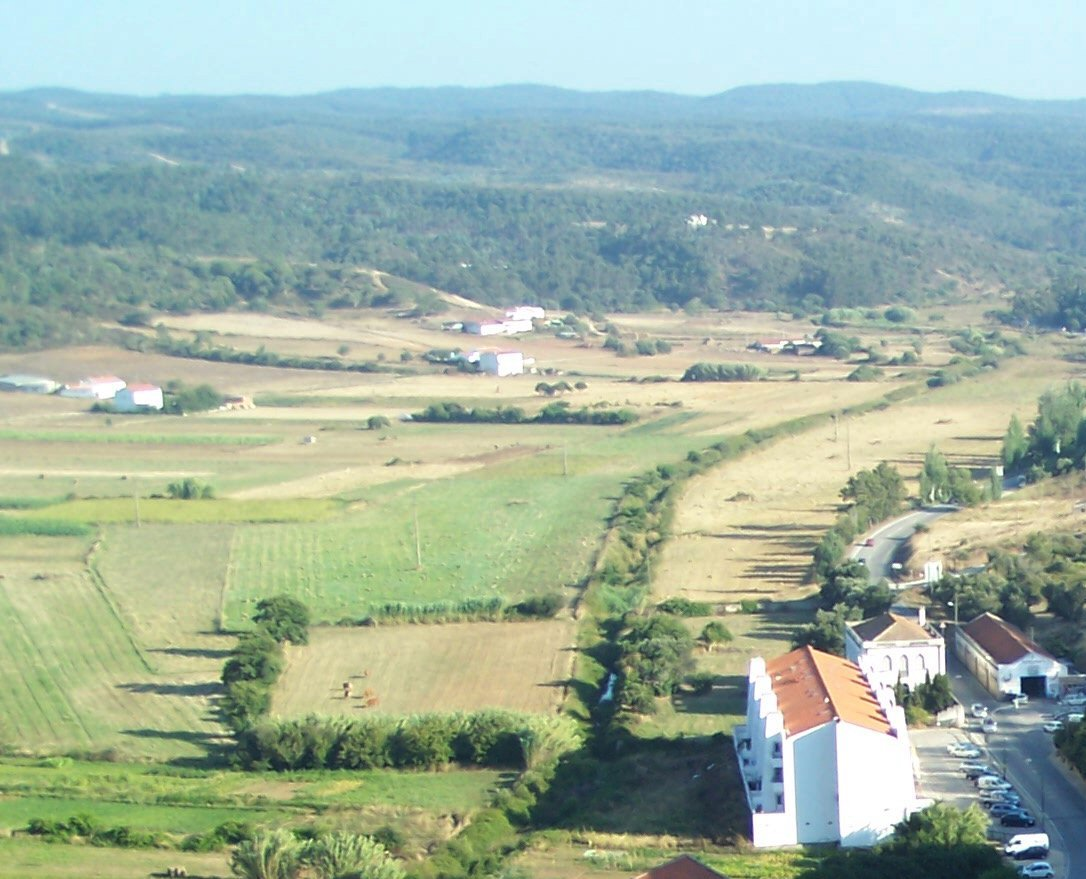
A view of the Ribeira de Aljezur crossed by the bridge

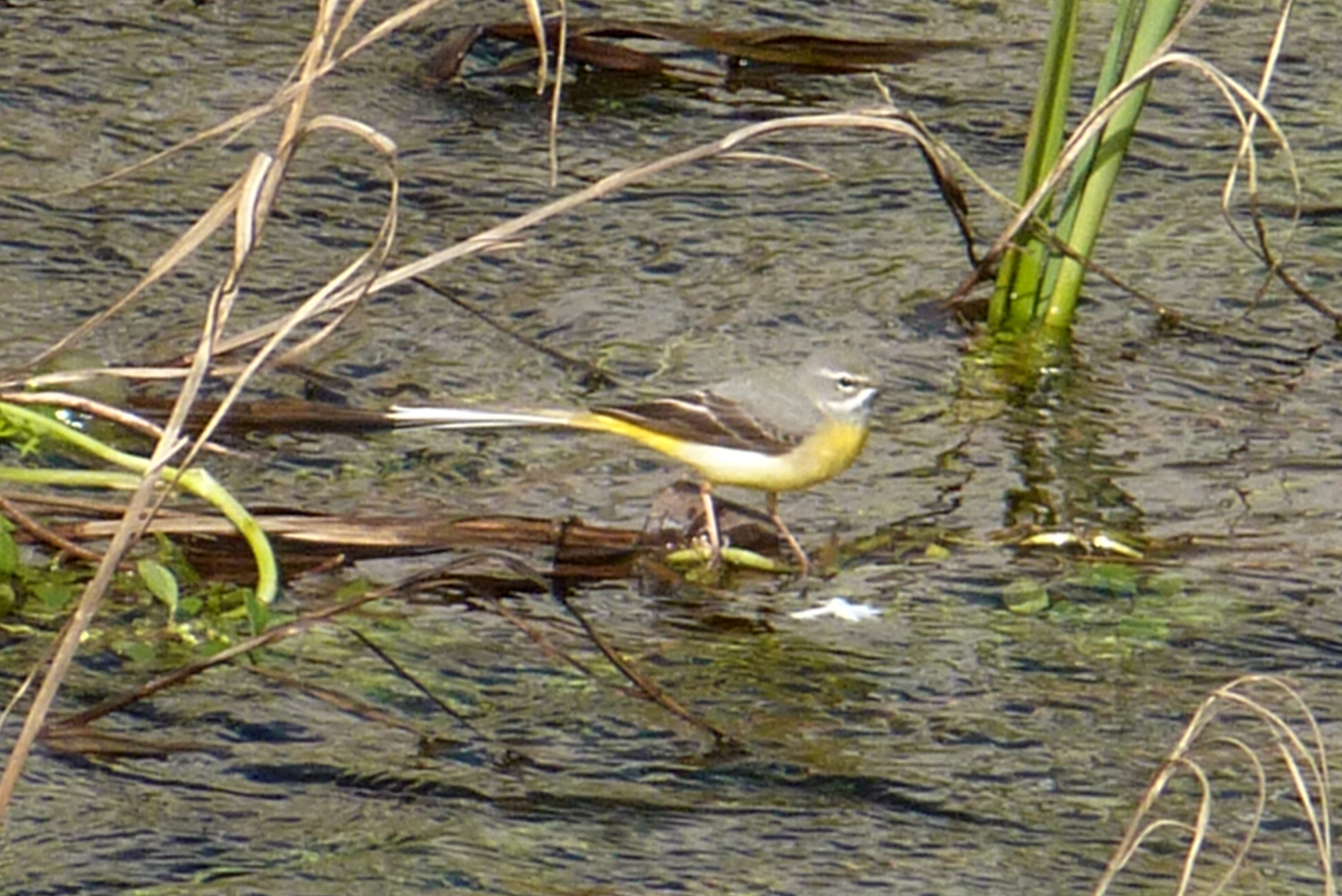
A Wagtail along the Ribeira de Aljezur
