= Praia da Amoreira =

Beach in Aljezur Municipality, Portugal

- Beach
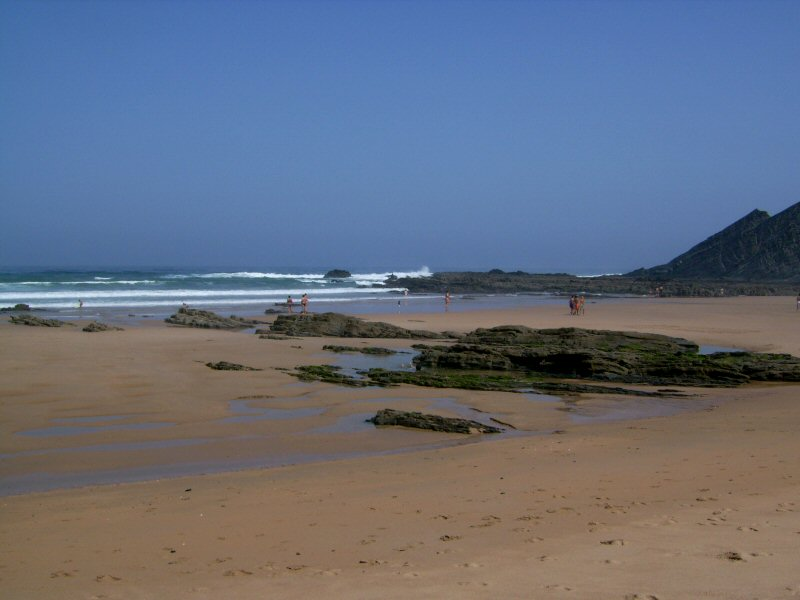

- Location of Praia da Amoreira in Portugal
- Coordinates: 37°21′5″N 8°50′40″W
- Location: Aljezur, Portugal

Praia da Amoreira is a beach within the Municipality of Aljezur, in the Algarve, Portugal. The beach is on the western Seaboard in the north west of the Algarve. The beach is 5.4 miles (8.7 km) north west of the village of Aljezur, and is 71.8 miles (115.6 km) north west, by road, from the regions capital of Faro.

== Description ==
The beach of Praia da Amoreira is within the Vicentine Coast Natural Park and is at the mouth of the Aljezur River. The beach has a wide expanse of golden fine sand which is backed by deep sand dunes. At the southern end of the beach is the mouth of the river Aljezur. The sea, when conditions are right, is a popular spot for surfing and bodyboarding. When the sea is rough it is not so good for swimming and paddling, especially for youngsters, but there are many rock pools to keep the young ones entertained. When the tide is out a shallow lagoon is left on the beach. The lagoon is a safe popular stretch of water both for children and their parents. Also at low tide the banks of the river Ribeira de Aljezur provides an excellent beach area but care should be taken at high tide as currents close to the mouth of the river can be very strong.

=== Car Park ===
On the cliffs at each end of the beach there are car parks, neither of which are very big, although the one on the northern side of the bay is the larger. Both car parks have access down to the beach by wooden boardwalks and stairs, but are not easy to use for disabled visitors.

== Facilities ==
During the summer season the beach is patrolled by lifeguards. At either end of the beach, close to the car parks there are beach bars with restaurants. The restaurant situated on the north side is called Restaurante Paraíso do Mar. It has a terrace and specialises in fresh grilled fish like sea bass and sea bream. There are toilets available at the Restaurante Paraíso do Mar.

== Gallery ==
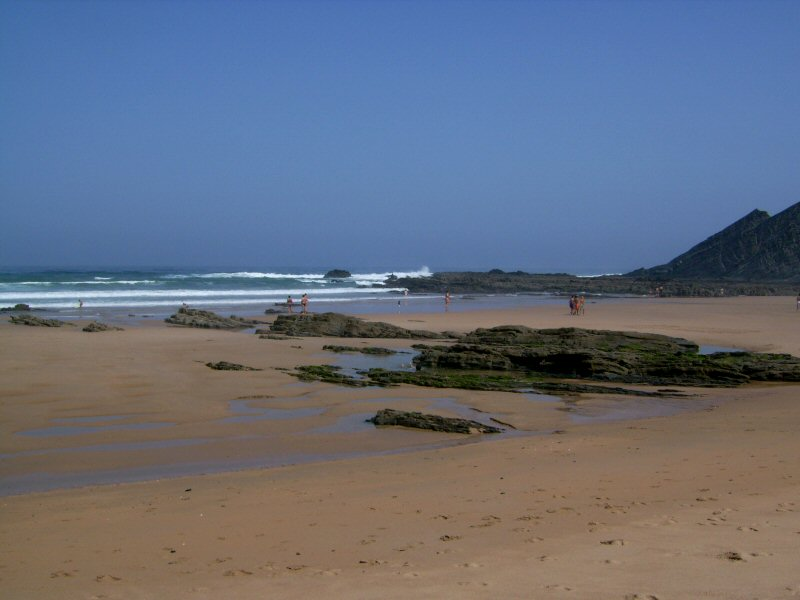
Beach and rock pools

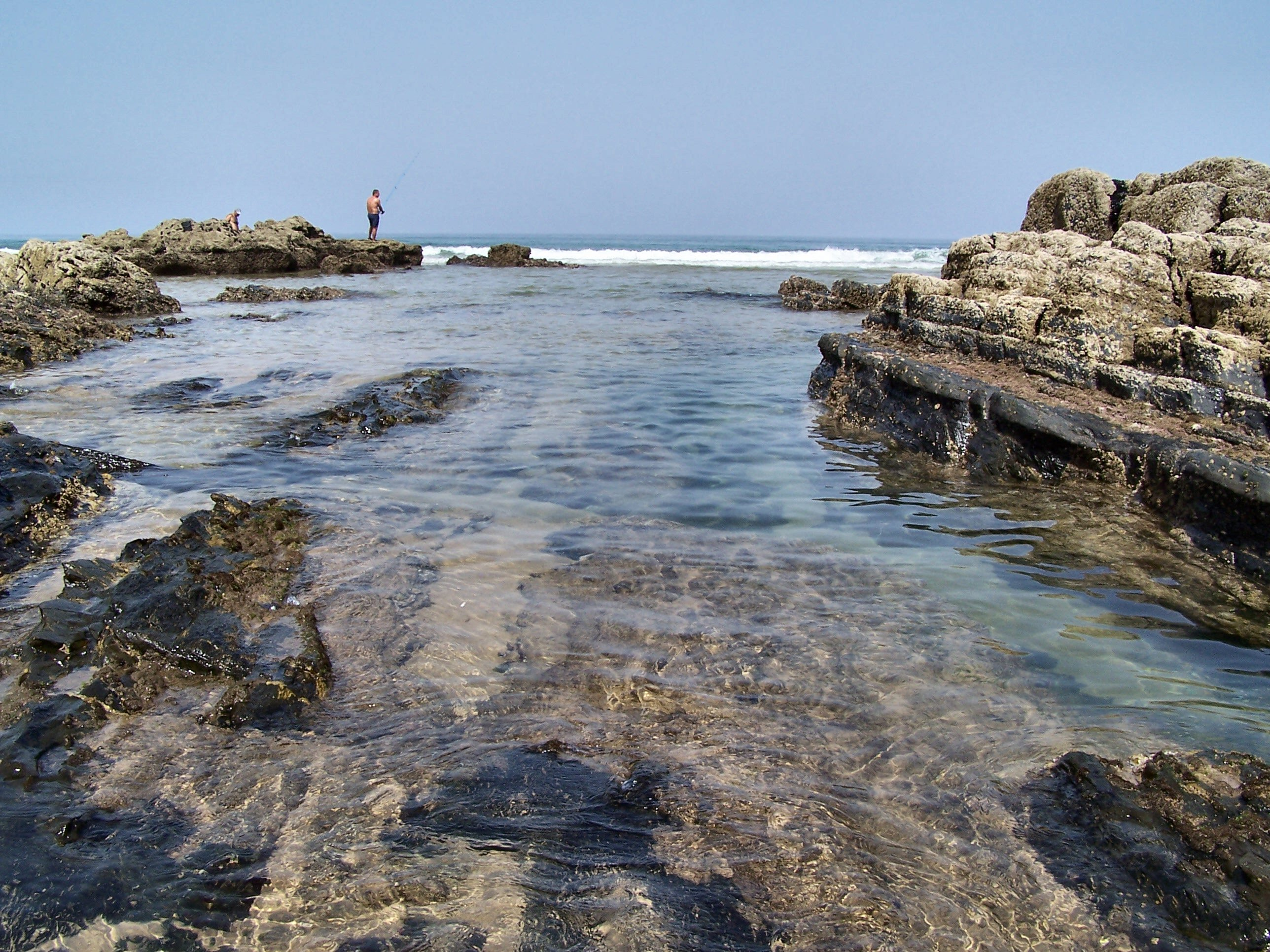
Rock pools

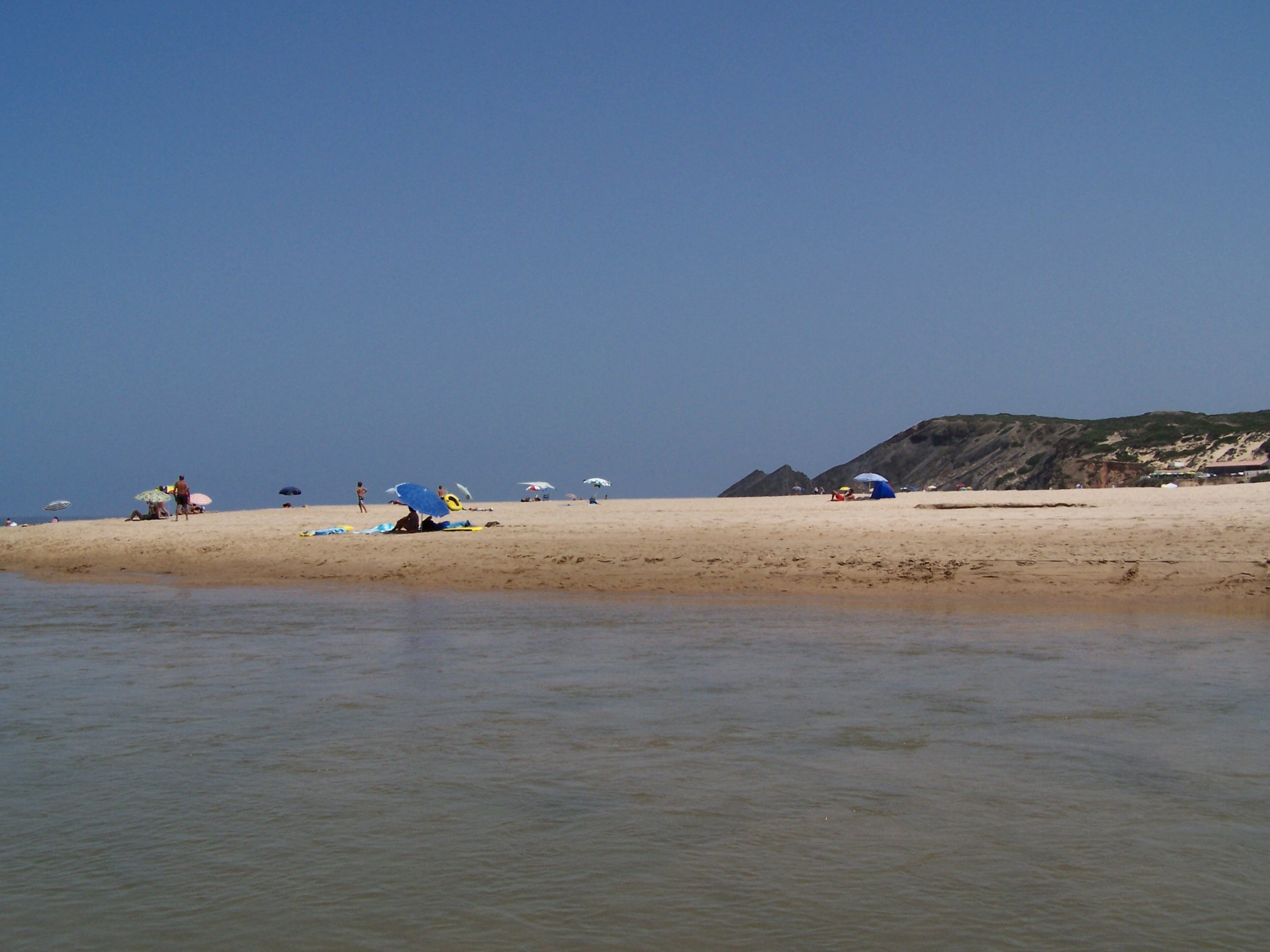
Low tide the banks of the river Ribeira de Aljezur

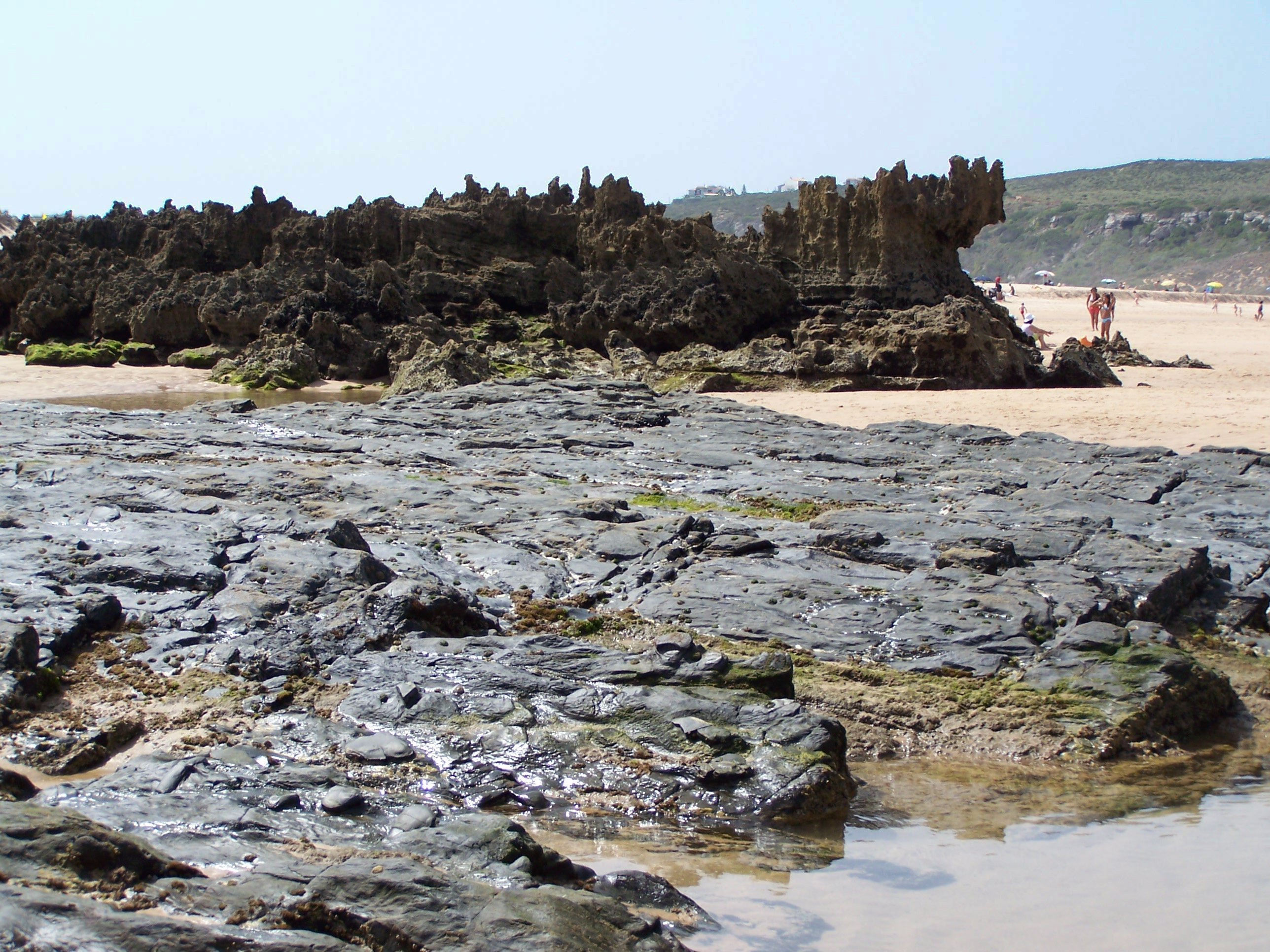
Rock formations

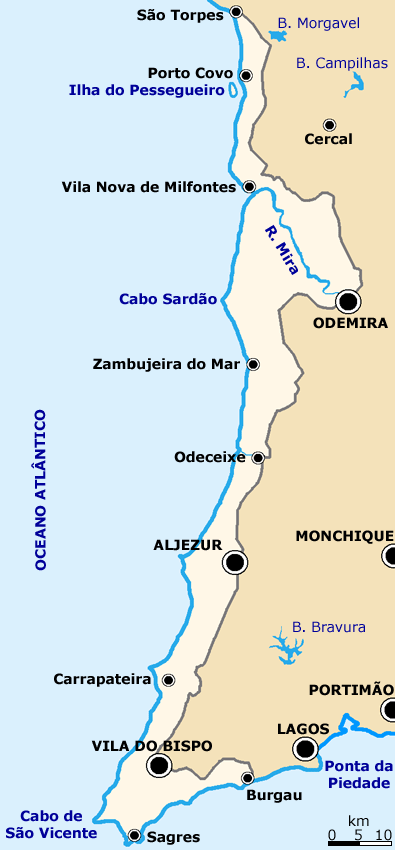
Map of the Vicentine Coast Natural Park
