= Praia da Baía dos Tiros =

Beach in Aljezur, Portugal

- Beach
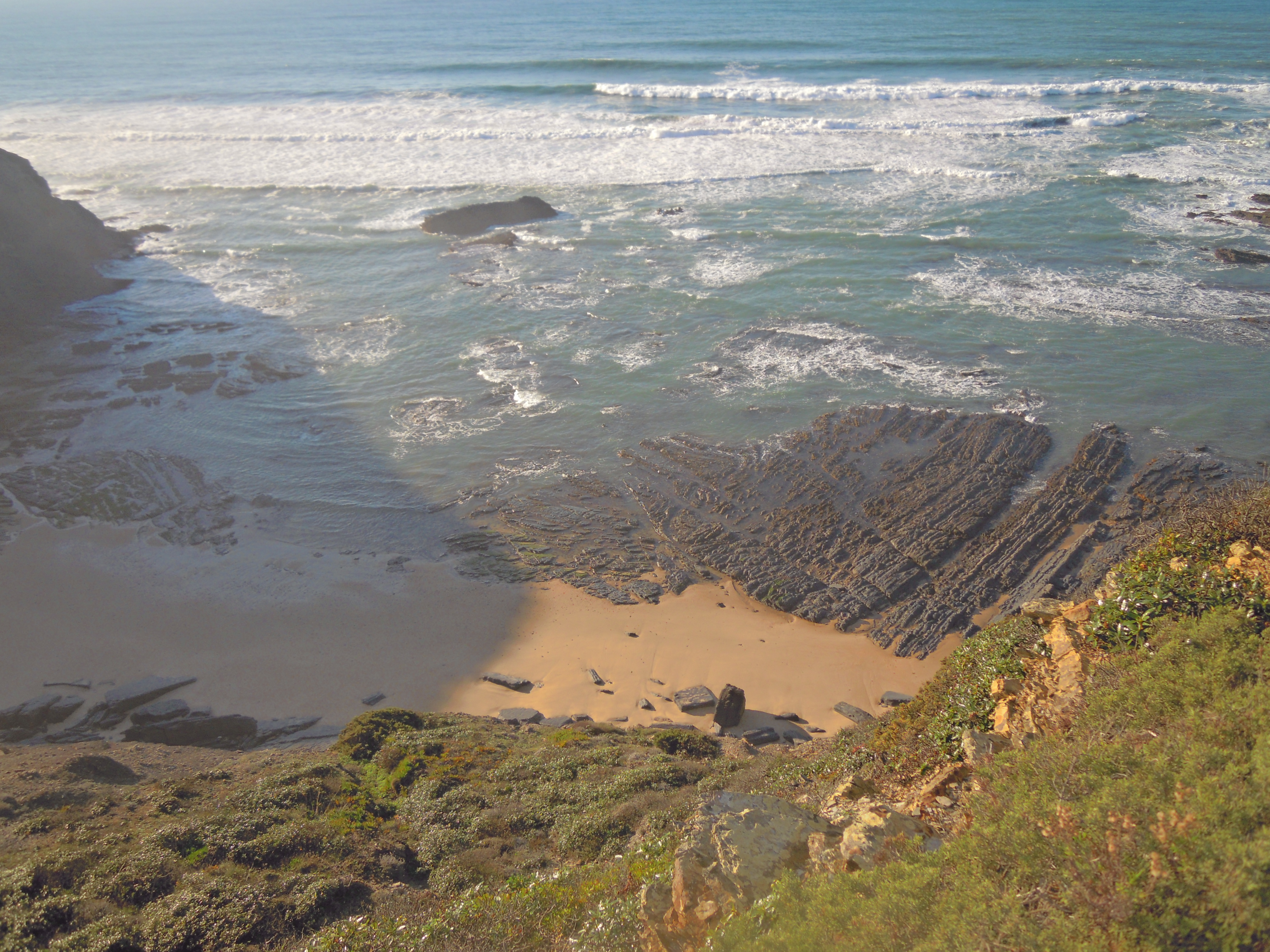
- Praia da Baía dos Tiros

- Location of Praia da Baía dos Tiros
- Coordinates: 37°24′22.88″N 8°48′46.22″W
- Location: Aljezur, Aljezur

Praia da Baía dos Tiros is a beach within the Municipality of Aljezur, in the Algarve, Portugal. The beach is on the western Seaboard in the extreme north-west of the Algarve. It is inside the Vicentine Coast Natural Park. The beach is 2.2 miles (3.5 km) north-west of the village of Maria Vinagre, and is 74.2 miles (119.4 km) north-west, by road, from the regions capital of Faro.

== Description ==
This beach is also known as Praia da Quebrada and is difficult to access and is frequented more by fishermen than by holiday makers. The beach has no infrastructure support is not guarded, but is an ideal location for those who wish to enjoy an unspoilt natural environment. The beach is only accessible by a steep and rocky trail which can be difficult to follow.

== Gallery ==
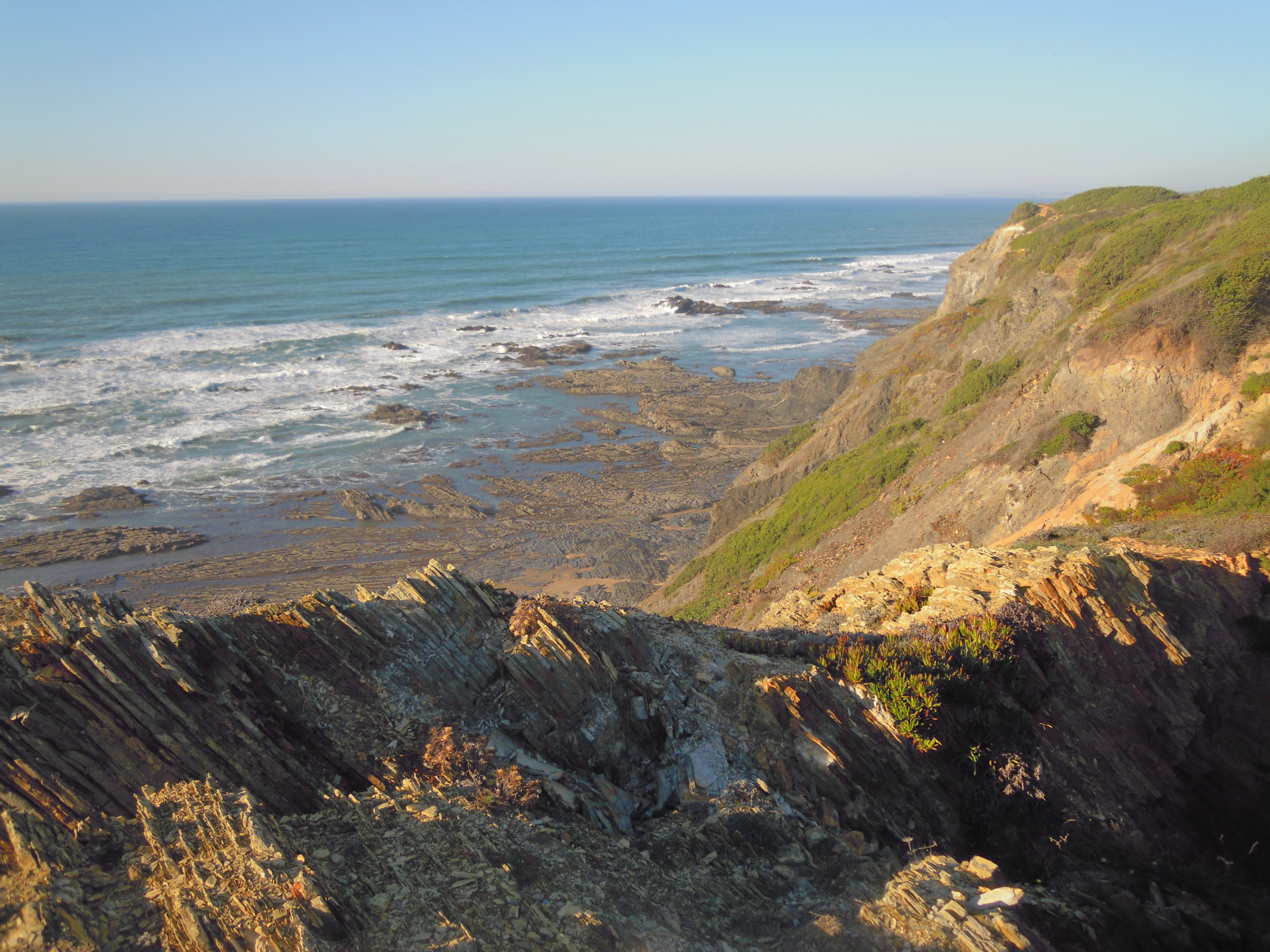
From the cliff top looking north

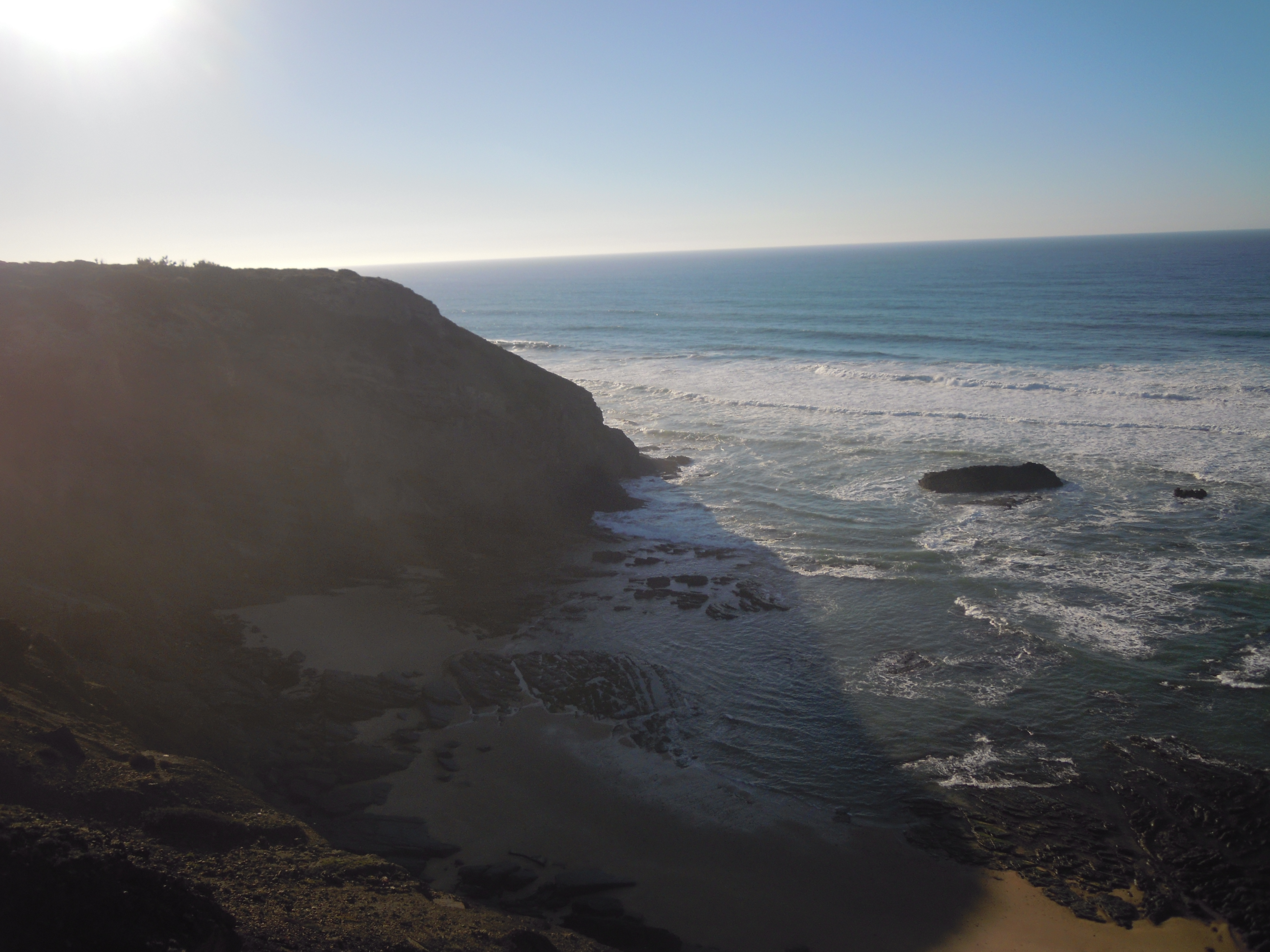
From the cliff top looking south

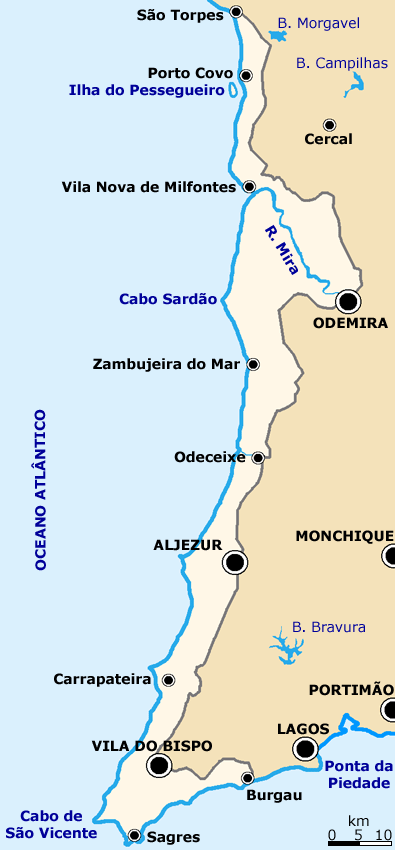
Map of the Vicentine Coast Natural Park
