= Praia de Vale dos Homens =

Beach in Aljezur, Portugal

Praia do Vale dos Homens
- Beach
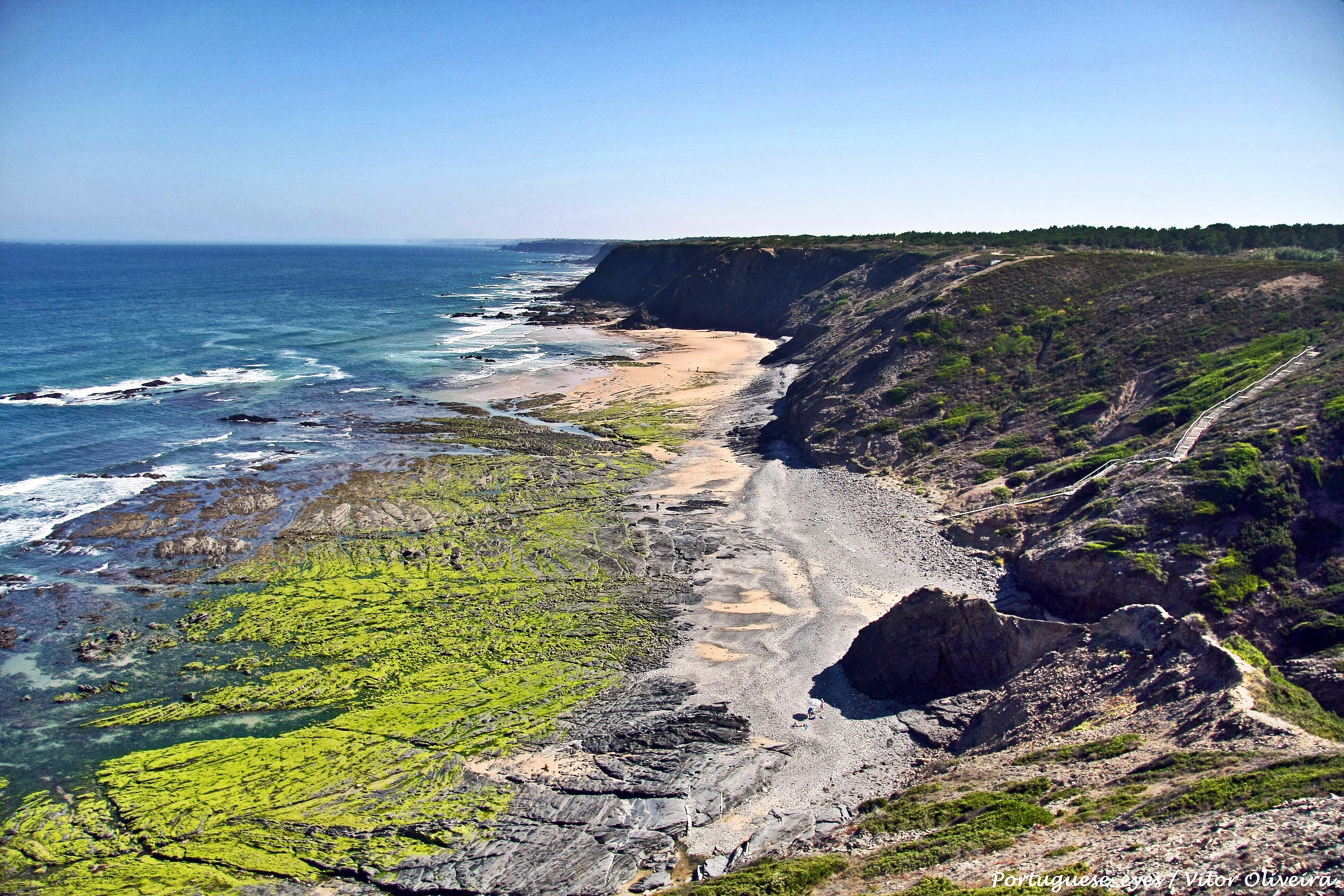
- Praia do Vale dos Homens

- Praia do Vale dos Homens
- Coordinates: 37°22′57″N 8°49′31″W
- Location: Aljezur, Algarve, Portugal

Praia do Vale dos Homens is a beach within the Municipality of Aljezur, in the Algarve, Portugal. The beach is on the western seaboard in the north west of the Algarve. The beach is 1.7 miles (2.7 km) north west of the village of Rogil, and is 72.4 miles (116.5 km) north west, by road, from the region's capital of Faro.

== Description ==
The beach of Praia do Vale dos Homens is inside the Vicentine Coast Natural Park. This secluded beach can be difficult to reach as visitors to the beach must negotiate a flight of 285 wooden steps down to the beach from the cliff above (where the car park is located). The surrounding countryside is made up of large areas of farmland and pine forests. The beach is popular for sports such as Kite surfing, Windsurfing, and bodyboard surfing. The sea here is designate with a yellow flag is considered too dangerous for swimming as there are potentially hazardous rock formations. Natural pools formed in the rocks near the waterline (in low tide) are popular among visitors as the water is slightly warmer and somewhat shielded from wave action. On the sidewalls of these pools numerous sea creatures can be seen.

In the summer of 2015 the walkable extension of the beach was greatly increased due to natural sediment transport allowing access to the north part, which in previous years was accessible only in low tide and required climbing rock features.

Visitors must respect the natural environment observing that they are within the limits of the Vicentine Coast Natural Park and stay safe both in the water and on the sand, as the rocky cliffs are prone to erosion and falling debris can be expected - safe and potentially hazardous zones are marked with signs.

== Gallery ==
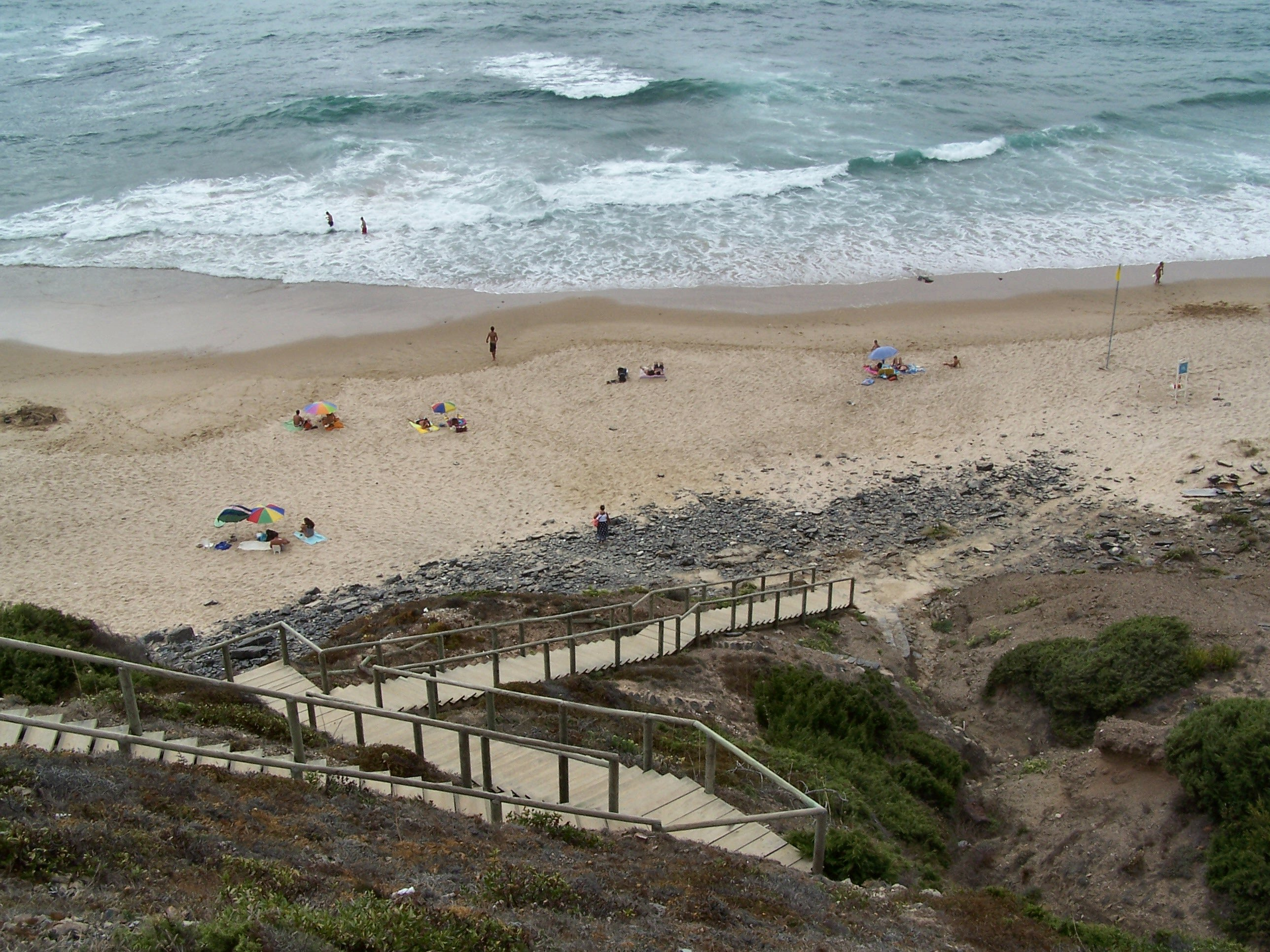
The timber stairs down to the beach

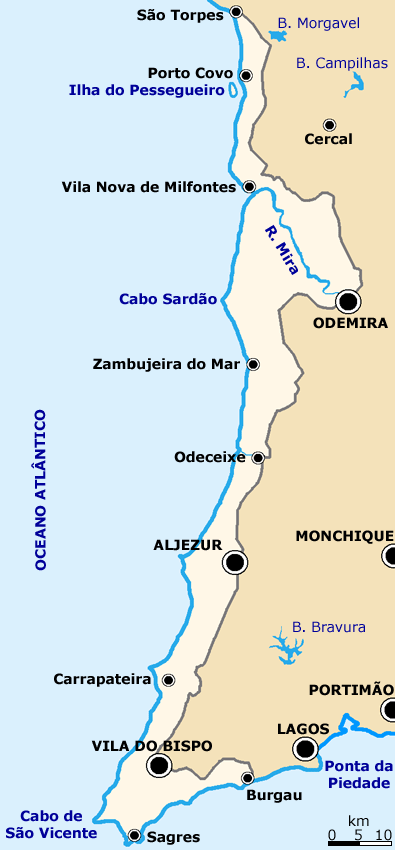
Map of the Vicentine Coast Natural Park

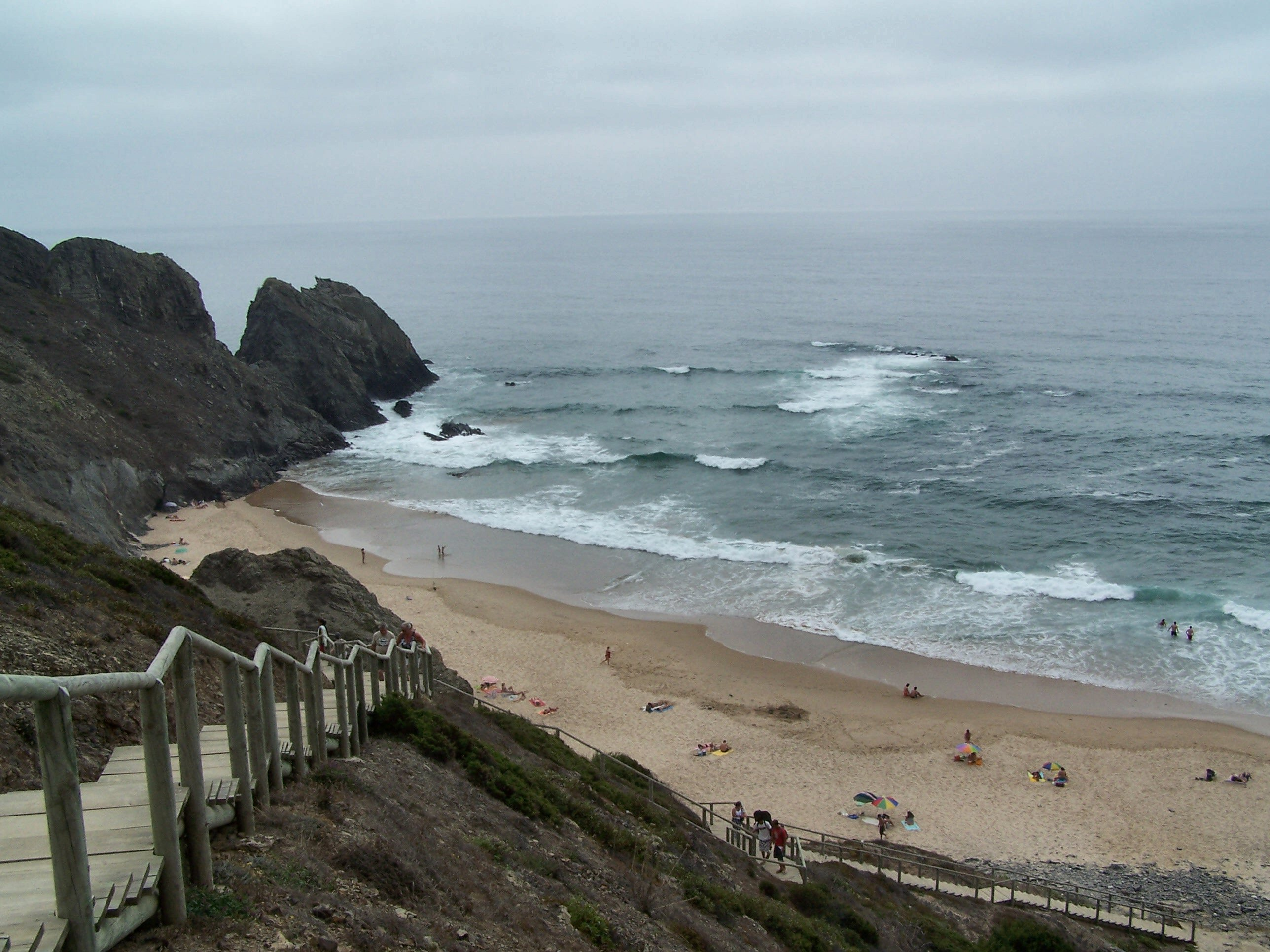

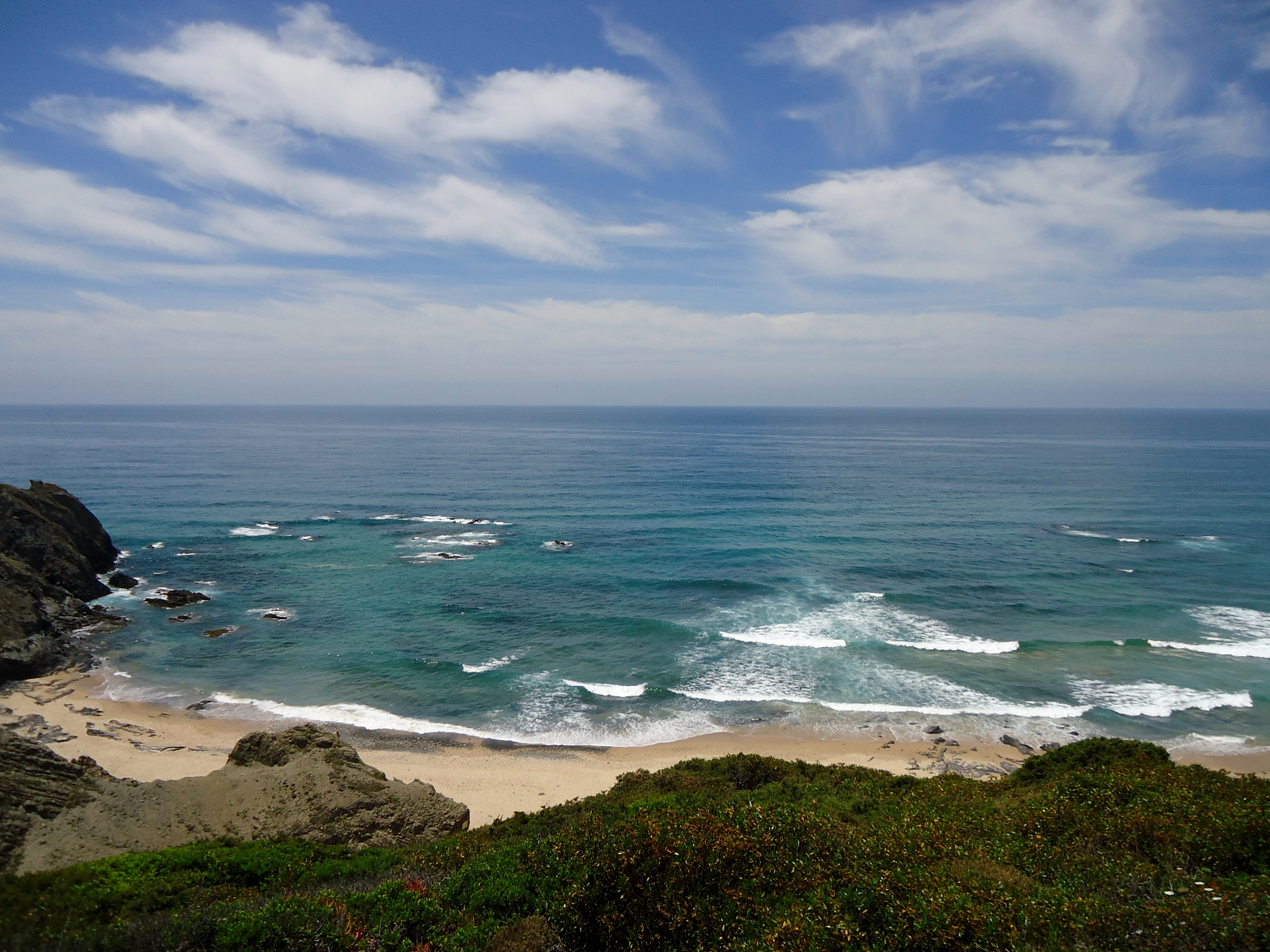
