= Fort Vera Cruz =

Fort in Vila do Bispo, Lagos, Portugal

- Forte da Vera Cruz
- Faro, Algarve, Algarve in Portugal
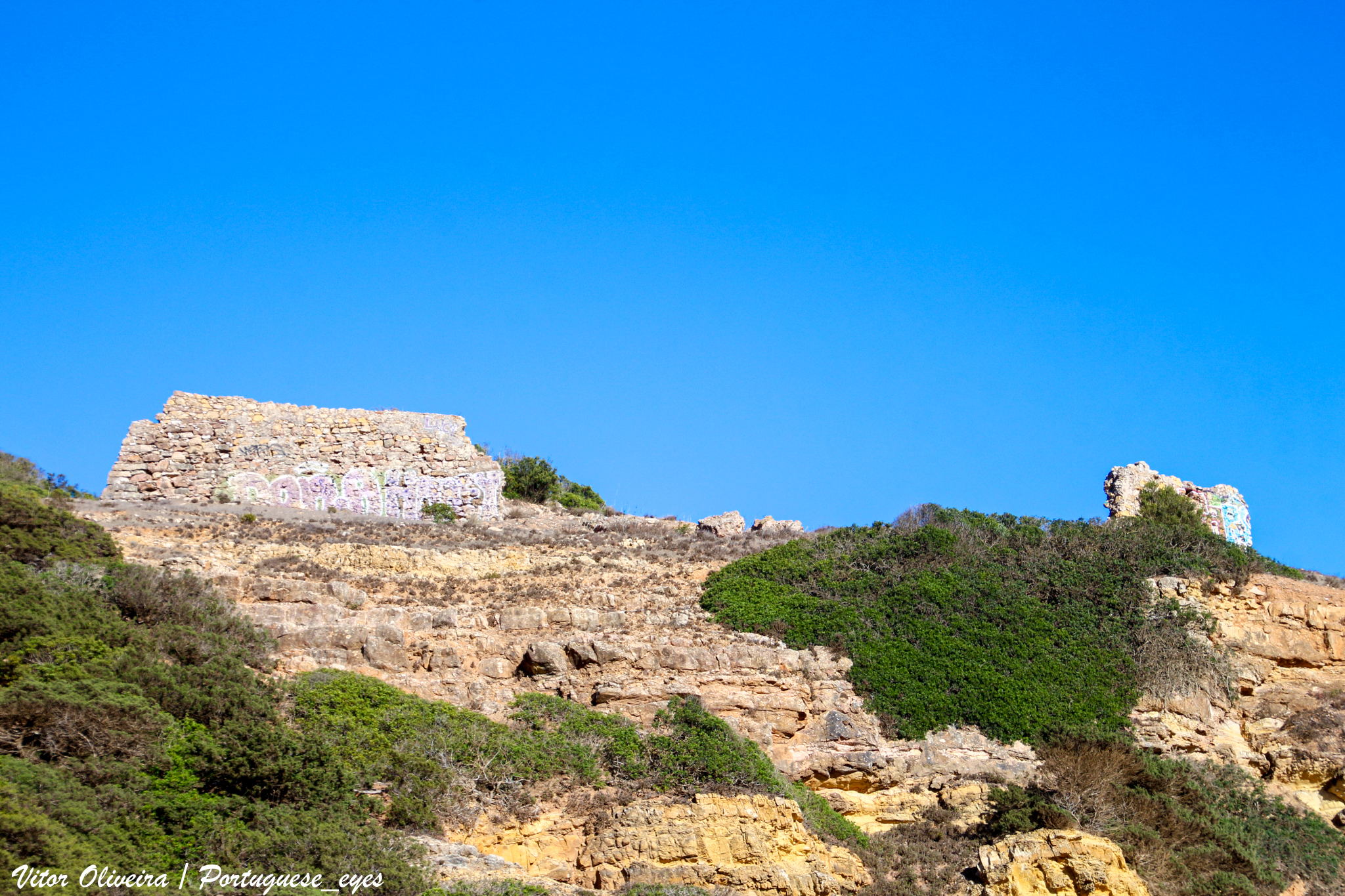
- Ruins of the Vera Cruz Fort

Site information
- Type: Fort
- Owner: Portuguese government
- Open to the public: Yes.
- Condition: Ruined

Location
- Coordinates: 37°03′40.63″N 8°50′19.22″W

Site history
- Built: 17th century

Fort Vera Cruz (Forte de Vera Cruz in Portuguese), also known as Fort Vera Cruz da Figueira (Forte da Vera Cruz da Figueira in Portuguese) or Figueira Fort, consist of the remains of a fort located in Vila do Bispo, in Algarve, Portugal.

== Description ==
The building is located on the east side of the Figueira Beach.

It consisted of a small fort, with two batteries, one below and another above, where artillery pieces were once placed, probably four in number. Within the fort the garrisons quarters could be found. Two artillery pieces were found underwater in the vicinity, originally located within the fort. The 1755 Earthquake caused the two guns, one of bronze and another of iron, to fall into the water, remaining below the rocks under the surf, according to an account by father Themudo, of the Figueira parish.

The fort itself is not classified as a monument of public interest; however, it is located within the protected area of the Southwest Alentejo and Vicentine Coast Natural Park.

== History ==
The fort was built in the 17th century, probably around 1640 during the reign of King John IV as part of the Restoration War. It was originally part of a complex system of fortifications meant to protect the coast close to the important port city of Lagos, which included also the forts in Meia Praia, Almádena, Zavial, Ponta da Bandeira, Pinhão, Ponta da Piedade and Porto de Mós.

On May 4, 1670, a group of north African pirates or privateers landed close to the fort in the middle of the night, aiming to attack the village of Figueira. However, they were detected and defeated by the local population under the leadership of the forts officer Afonso Telo. The fort was featured in the map of Algarve produced by Laurent Brémont around 1760. A decree of September 27, 1805, signed by then prince-regent John decommissioned all forts between the Zavial and Meia Praia. By 1821, a bronze gun had fallen into the sea caused by a landside. All the dependencies of the fort were put up for sale in 1940, but no person demonstrated interest in acquiring it.
