= Rogil =

- Civil parish
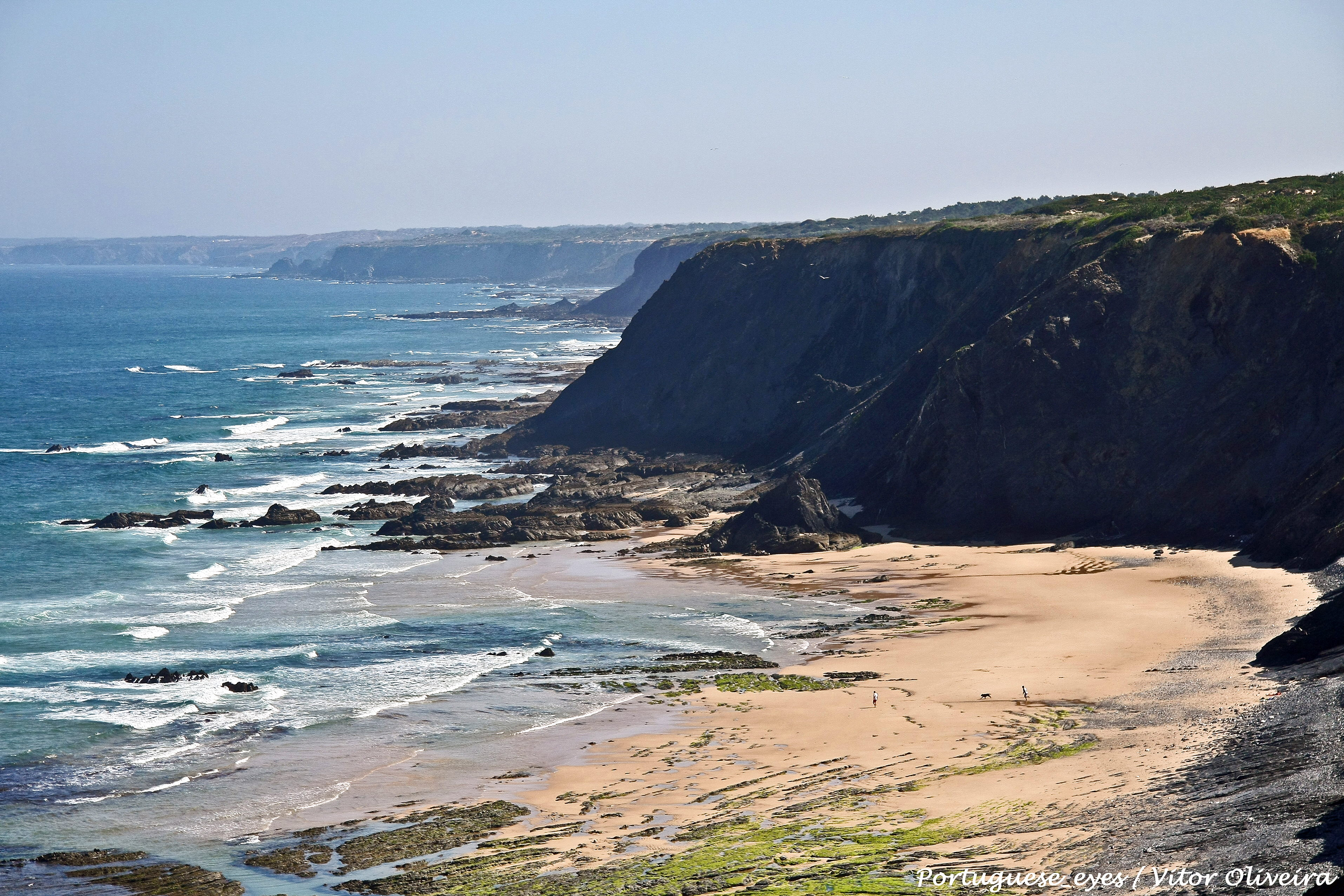
- Praia do Vale dos Homens in Rogil

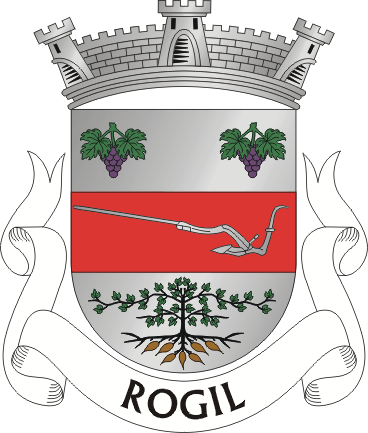
- Coat of arms

- Location in Portugal
- Coordinates: 37.369°N 8.800°W
- Country: Portugal
- Region: Algarve
- Intermunic. comm.: Algarve
- District: Faro
- Municipality: Aljezur

Area
  - Total: 34.96 km^{2} (13.50 sq mi)

Population (2011)
  - Total: 1,126
  - Density: 32.21/km^{2} (83.42/sq mi)
- Time zone: UTC+00:00 (WET)
  - Summer (DST): UTC+01:00 (WEST)
- Website: Page on CM Aljezur website

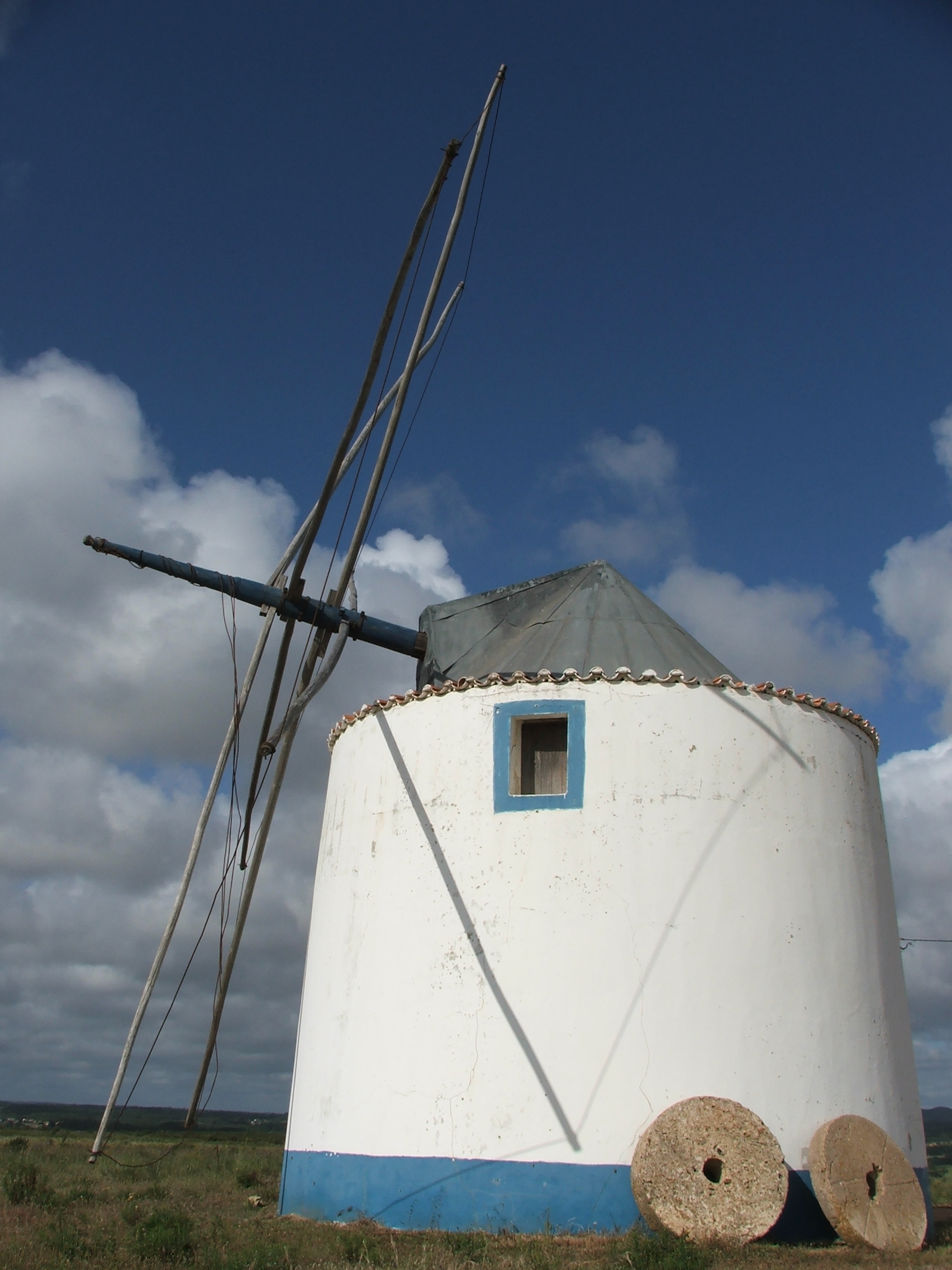
The Moinho de Arregata just south of Rogil village centre

Rogil (European Portuguese pronunciation: [ʁuˈʒil]) is a Portuguese civil parish in Aljezur Municipality. It lies within the Southwest Alentejo and Vicentine Coast Natural Park. The population in 2011 was 1,126, in an area of 34.96 km^{2} (13.50 sq mi).

The village of Rogil lies on a plateau at about 95 metres above sea level. There is no church listed on the diocesan website.

== Adjacent parishes ==
The parish is bordered by:

- north - Odeceixe
- east - Marmelete
- south - Aljezur
- west - Atlantic Ocean.
