= Aljezur River =

River of the Algarve, Portugal

Aljezur River Amoreira River
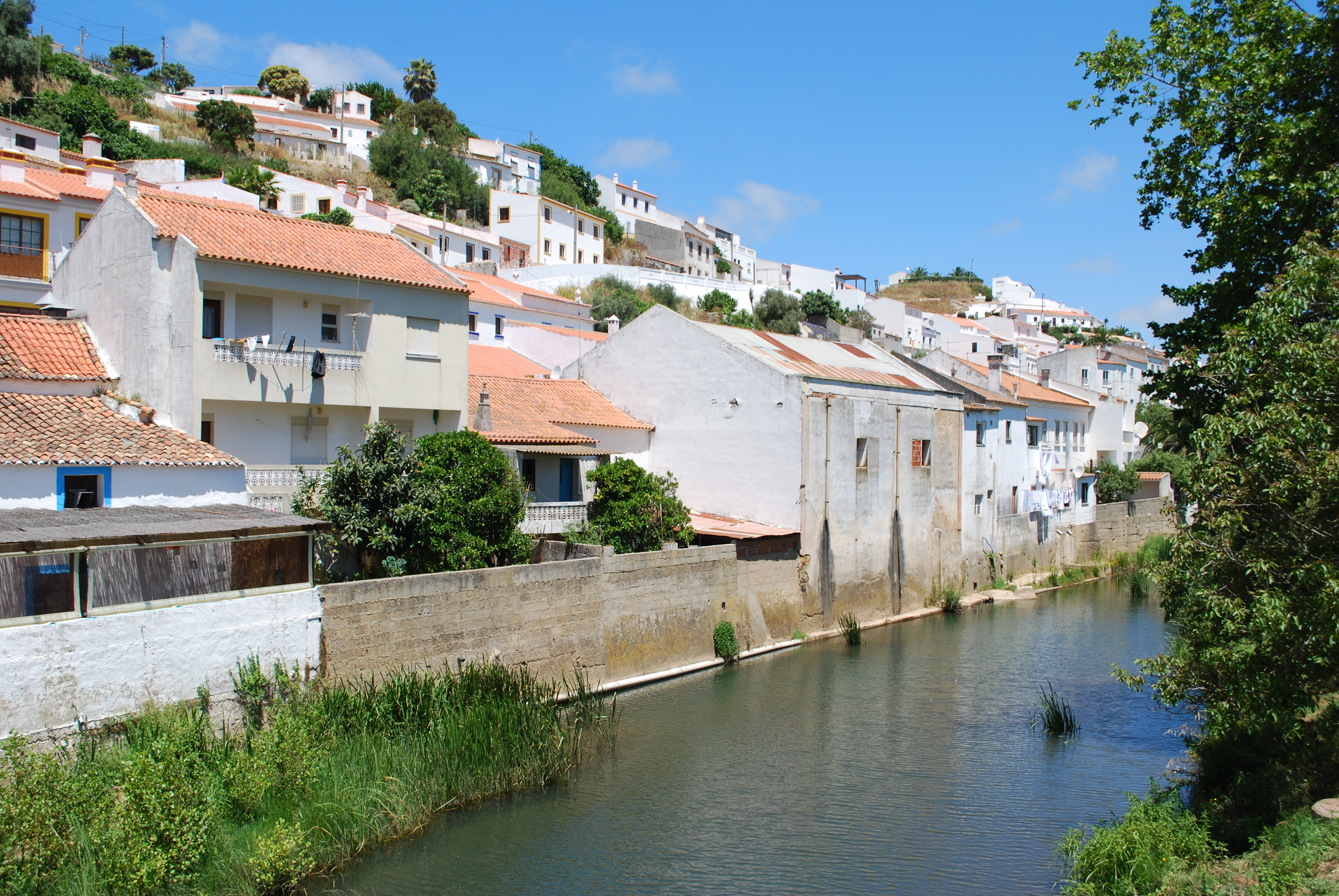
- Aljezur River in the village of Aljezur

- Aljezur River at Aljezur
- Native name: Ribeiro de Aljezur (Portuguese)

Location
- Country: Portugal
- Region: Algarve
- District: Faro
- Municipality: Aljezur

Physical characteristics
- Source
  - location: Aljezur (parish)
  - coordinates: 37°18′59.8″N 8°48′11.6″W
- Mouth: The west coast of the Algarve into the Atlantic at Praia da Amoreira

The Aljezur River (Portuguese pronunciation: [alʒɨˈzuɾ]) is a small river in the Portuguese region of the Algarve. The river runs westwards for 9.8 kilometres (6.1 mi) from its start in the village of Aljezur from the confluence of the River Alfambres and River Cerca to its mouth on the Atlantic western Algarve coast at Praia da Amoreira.

== Description ==
From its confluence the river loops through a ravine around the base of a hill on which is the ruins of the Morrish castle of Aljezur (Portuguese: Castelo de Aljezur). The Moors constructed a port at the base of the castle and made the river navigable out to the ocean at Amoreira. The river and port remained navigable until the 18th century after which channel fell into a state of disrepair following the destruction of the village caused by the 1755 earthquake.

From Aljezur the river meanders through a narrow valley which is within the Vicentine Coast Natural Park at the seaward end the river opens up to a narrow marshland estuary. This habitat supports such creatures as kingfishers, marsh warblers, grey herons and otters.
