= Castle of Aljezur =

Medieval castle in Aljezur, Portugal

- Castelo de Aljezur
- Faro, Algarve, Algarve in Portugal
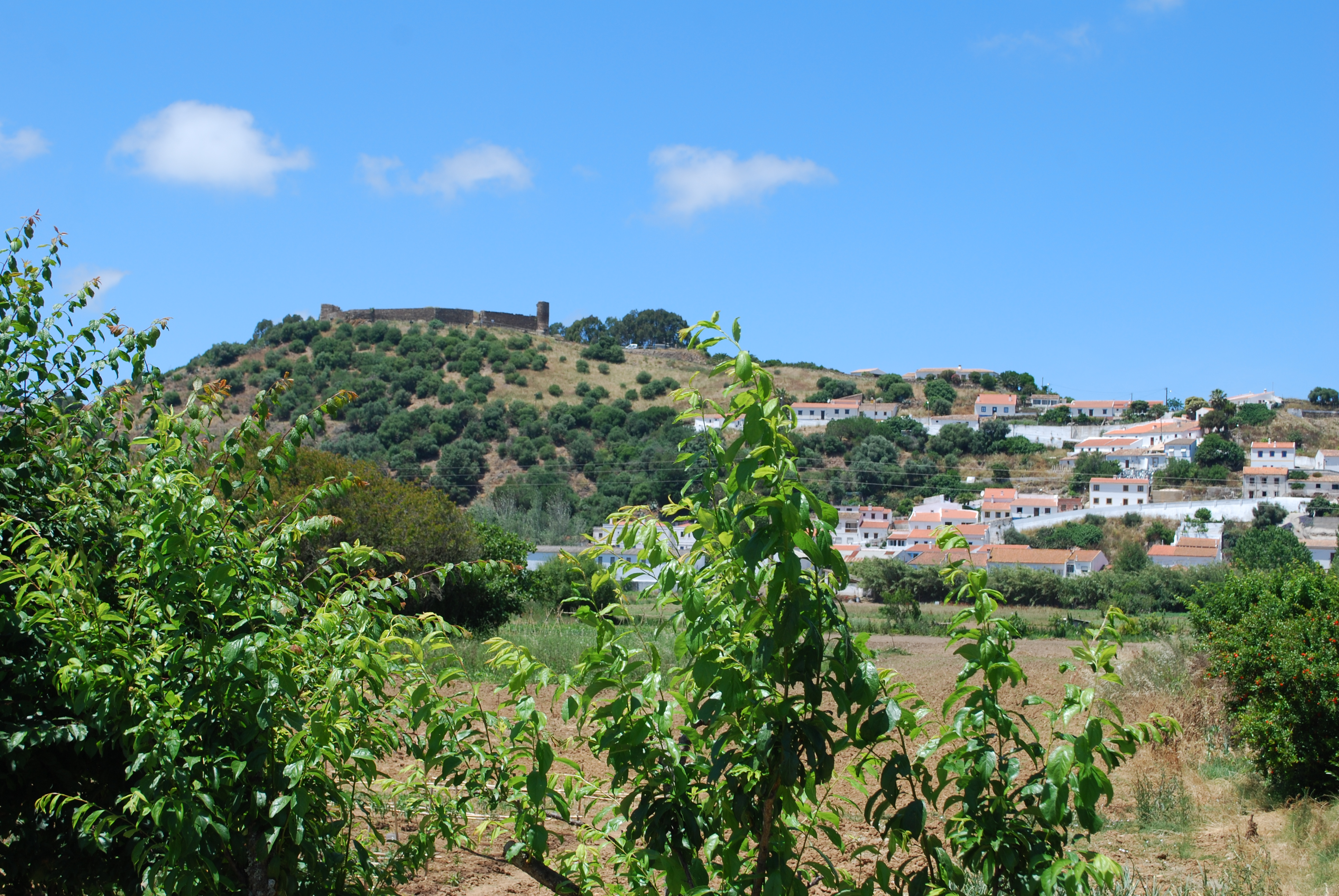
- The location of the Castle of Aljezur on the hilltop overlooking the village of town of Aljezur

Site information
- Type: Castle
- Owner: Portuguese Republic
- Operator: Câmara Municipal de Aljezur
- Open to the public: Public

Location
- Coordinates: 37°18′58.83″N 8°48′17.87″W

Site history
- Built: Neolithic
- Materials: Stone masonry

The Castle of Aljezur (Portuguese: Castelo de Aljezur) is a medieval castle founded in the parish of Aljezur, in the municipality of the same name overlooking the Aljezur River . Excavations in the castle have discovered that the location was occupied during the Bronze and Iron Ages, while the parade grounds, habitational structures, and two silos date to the 12th and 13th centuries.

== History ==
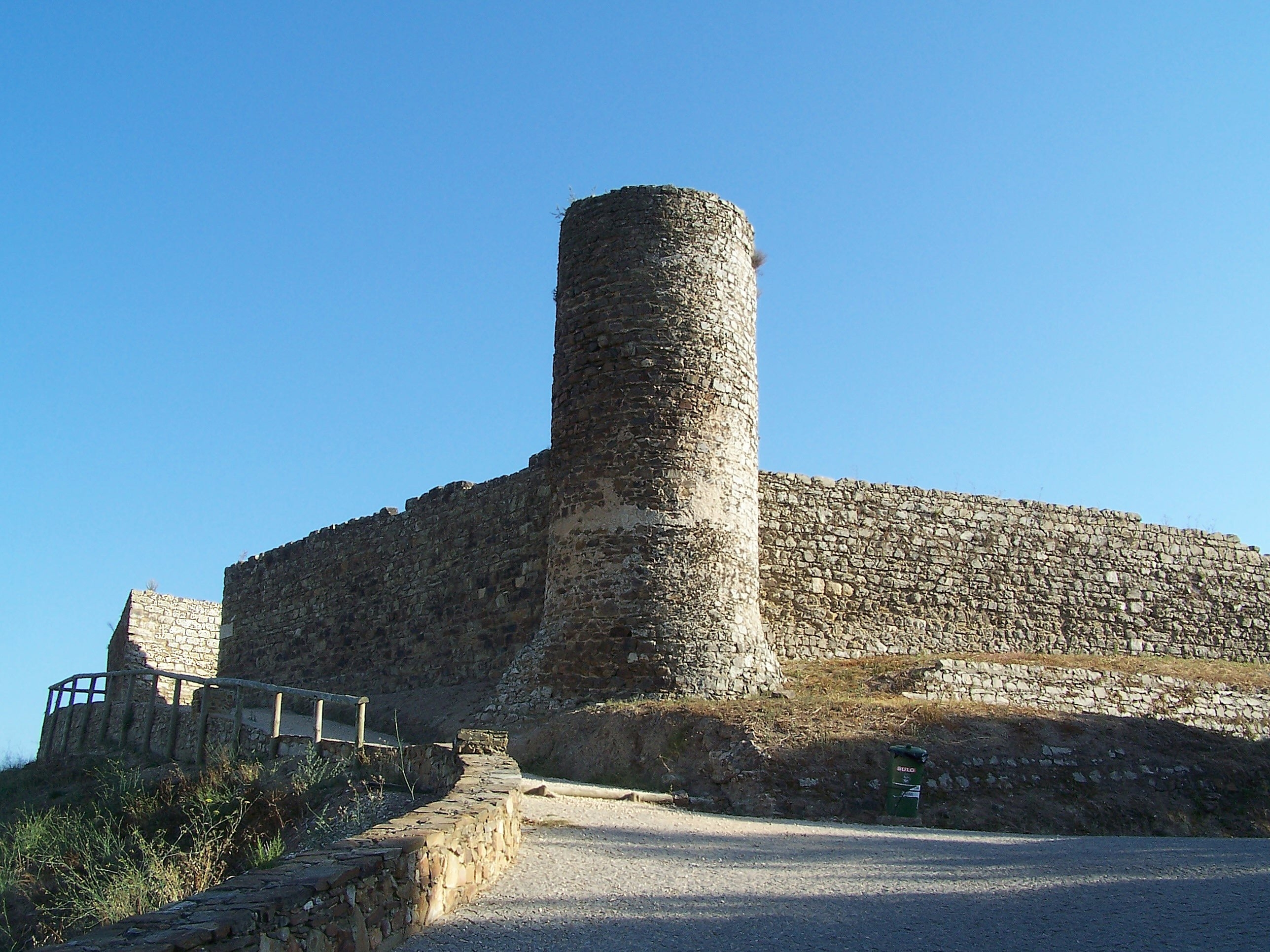
Main entrance to the castle structure

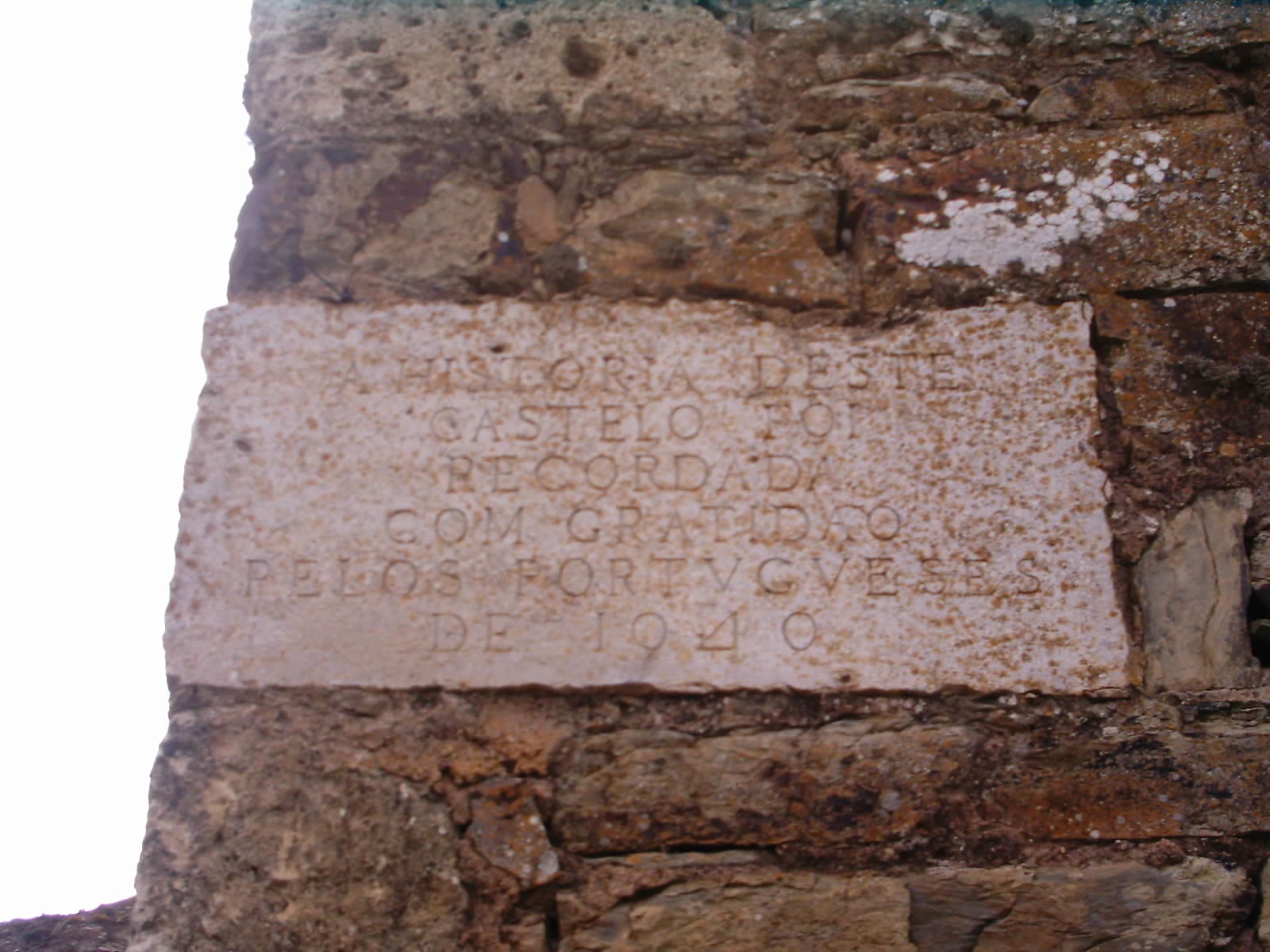
Inscription on the corner of the castle, dedicated to the castle's early founding: marking its centenary

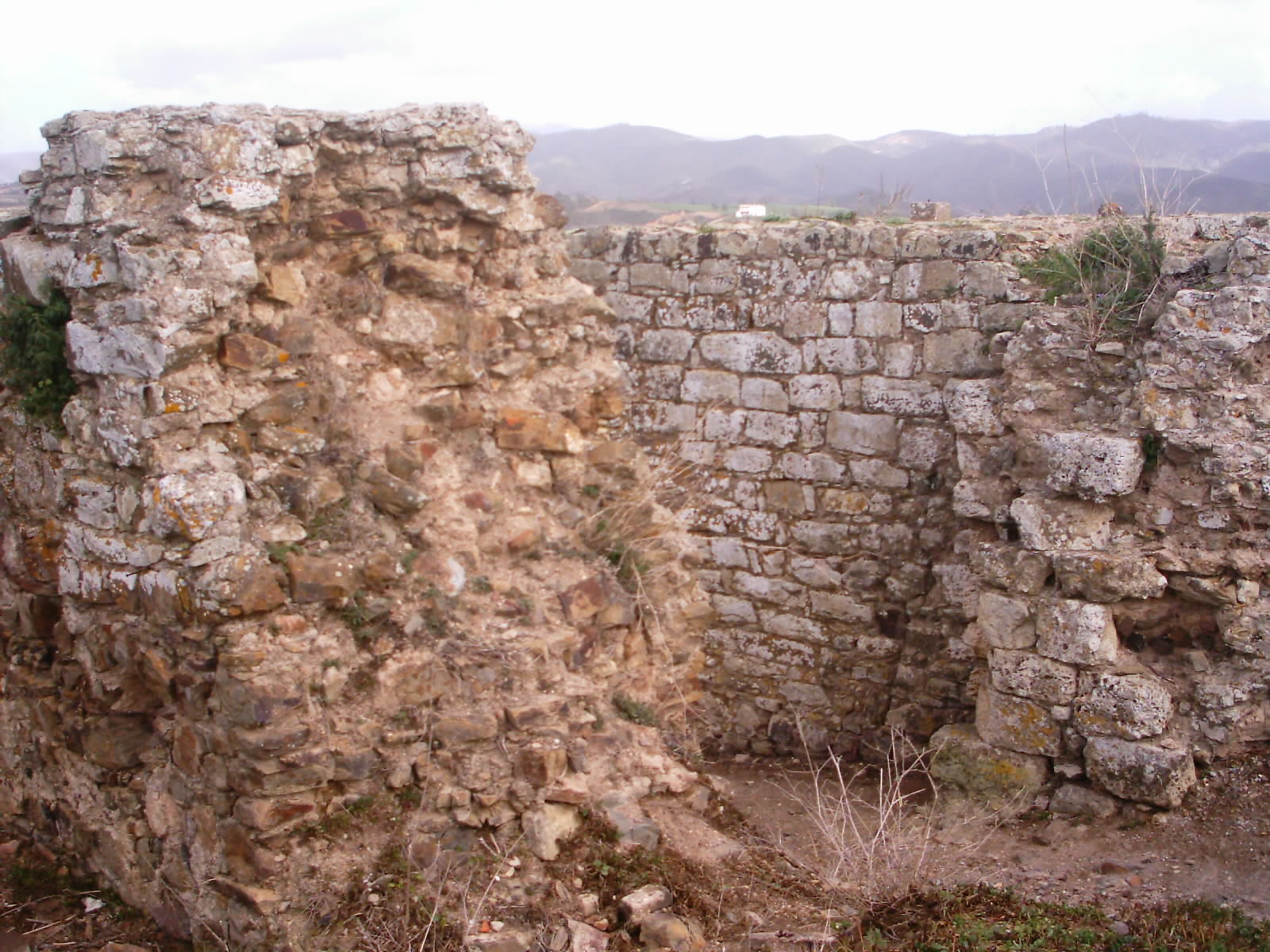
Part of the ruined inside walls of the castle

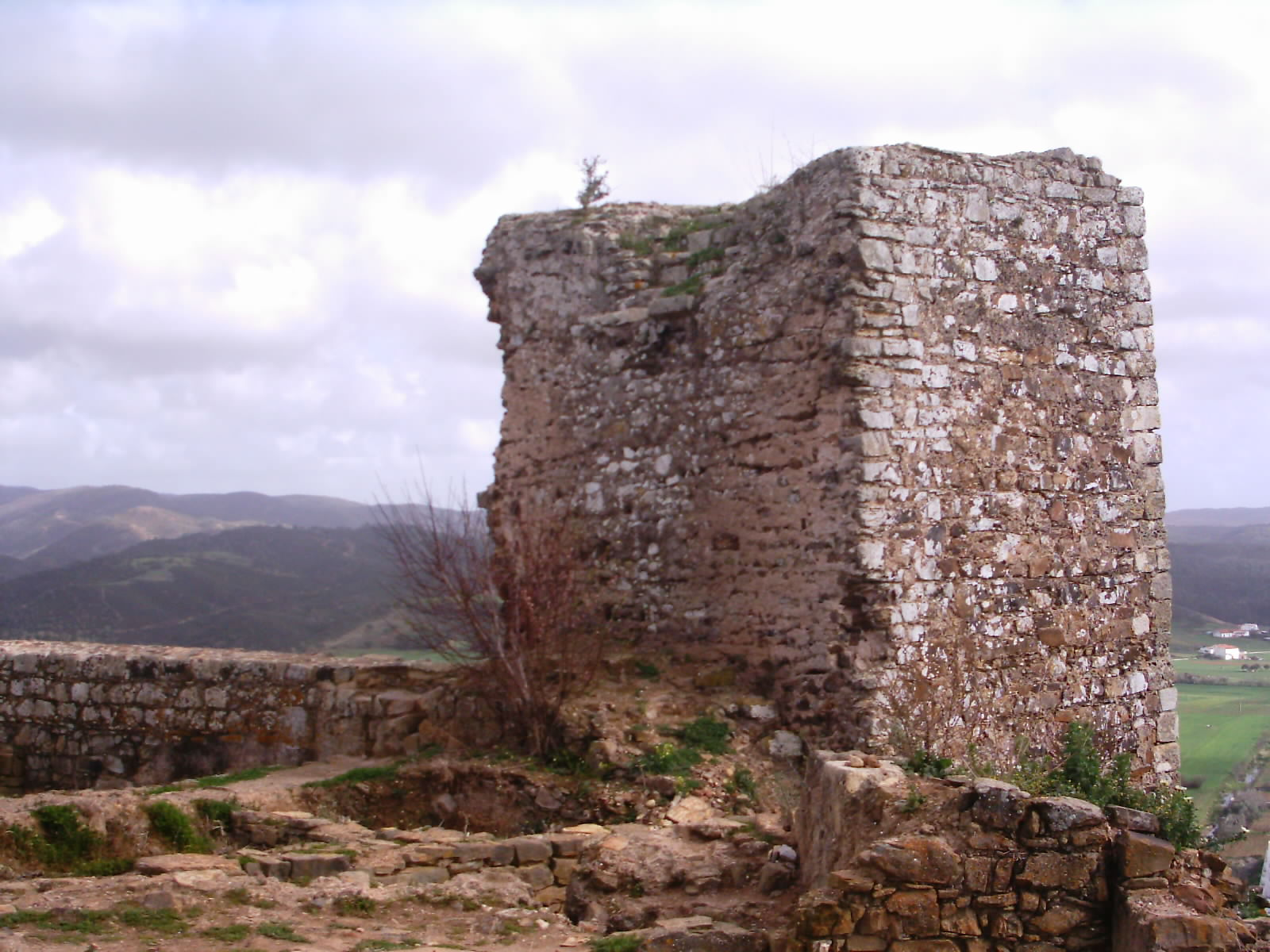
One of the sentry towers

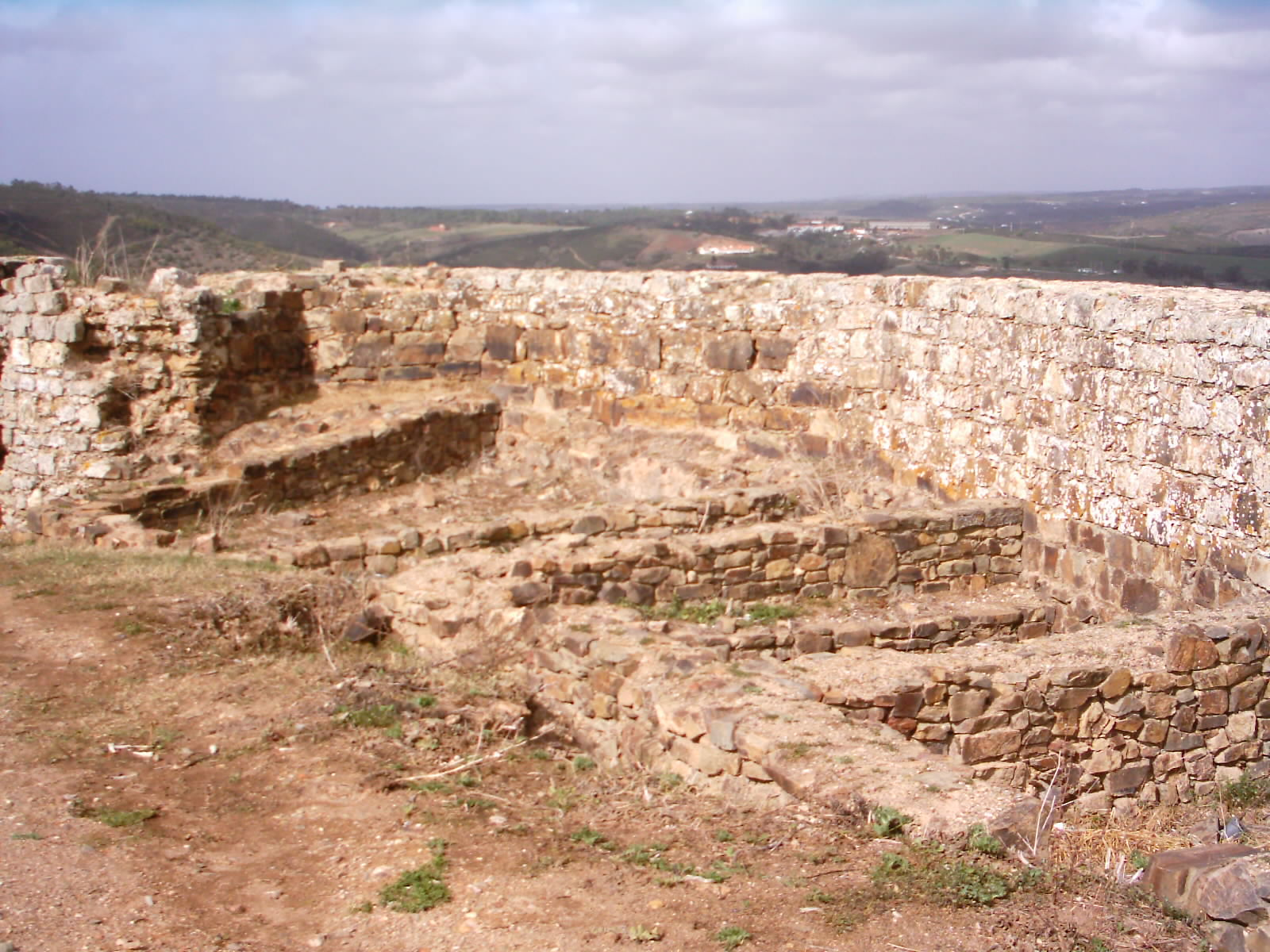
Partial ruins alongside the main wall

The site of the castle was occupied, successively and uninterrupted by Lusitanians, who constructed a castro to oversee their lands, before being pushed aside by the Romans, who constructed a lookout. By the 7th-8th century, the Visigoths also used the space as a sentry to safeguard their territory.

By the beginning of the 10th century, a small town was founded by Arabs, who reformulated their defences, constructing various dependencies within and outside the walls. Of these constructions, only the cistern in the castle survives their period of occupation. The castle was part of the Moorish defensive line of Silves, during the Almohad Caliphate and era of the Iberian taifas.

In 1242 (or 1246), Aljezur was conquered by knights loyal to Paio Peres Correia. As legend suggests, the conquest of the castle aided by a Moorish woman, who betrayed her fellow countrymen and delivered the citadel into the hands of the knights The Lenda of Maira Aires, also suggests that the castle was taken by Paio Correia on 24 June, on the feast day of the village's patron saint. Its occupation did not result in the partial or total destruction of the castle, although alterations to the fortress occurred in the first decades of its Christian occupation.

Following the 1267 Treaty of Badajoz, the castle and other fortresses along the Algarve were transferred into the dominion of the King Afonso III of Portugalby Alfonso X of Castile. King Denis of Portugal issued a foral (charter) to the region of Aljezur on 12 November 1280, while staying in Estremoz. Thirty years later, the monarch bartered away the Castle of Aljezur and other lands for the town of Almada (1 December 1297).

In 1448, during a visitation by members of the Order of Santiago to the town of Aljezur, they referred to the castle being in a state of abandon, at the same time prohibiting the removal of rock and masonry from the site for other constructions. Further, the report mentioned directions by the Order to reconstruct the walls and the cleaning of the cistern.

On 20 August 1504, King Manuel of Portugal reissued a foral from Lisbon, where he conferred the title of honrada (honoured) to the charter (seen as a way to attract new settlers to the region).

The 1755 Lisbon earthquake caused the destruction of all the homes in the town, and demolishing most of the castle, saving only the tribune and the Presbytery in the church.

As a result of the 1940-1941 commemorations of the Portuguese centenary, the walls was partially reconstructed.

On 19 September 1972, a decision by the JNE considered future plans to convert the castle into a hotel should only be considered if the volume of remodelling required did not harm the interior of the monument. Yet, this decision did not inhibit other business-related plans, leading eventually to the 1 June 1992 decision to transfer the castle into the authority of the IPPAR Instituto Português do Património Arquitectónico (Portuguese Institute of Architectural Patrimony), a forerunner of the IGESPAR Instituto de Gestão do Património Arquitectónico e Arqueológico (Institute for the Management of Architectural and Archaeological Heritage). In the meantime, a project to illuminate the castle grounds (in 1973 and, again, in 1981) and construction of an improved road accessway and parking area were completed in 1976-1977 by the municipal government of Aljezur (CMA). Urgent consolidation and repairs of the walls were undertaken in 1985.

On 21 November 1996, the CMA of Aljezur issued a public tender to elaborate a project to reconstruct, preserve and consolidate the remains of the Castle for the purposes of utilizing the structure as a method attracting tourism to the region. Two years later (29 September 1998), the final plan was presented publicly.

== Architecture ==
The castle is located in a rural environment, isolated on top of an 88-metre hilltop (the smaller of two that overlook the old town) and circuited by the winding Aljezur ravine. During the Moorish occupation of the region, the river was navigable (lasting until the 18th century). With the exception of planned core around the new Church, the village is characterized by Moorish accents; the old village, consists of low stature homes, adapted to the into the rugged terrain of the hill in an amphitheatre-shape, accompanying the contour. Owing to its location, over the town, it was characterized as a defensive structure along the river and guardian of its port.

Getting to the castle from the N120 roadway is accomplished across the Vale da Telha, following in the direction of Rua das Figueiras, then Rua das Piteiras towards the Rua Serro do Mosqueiro. Access to the property is made by a pedestrian ramp on the eastern end of the castle, accessible from a main road leading from the town. The entrance directly makes access to the main enclosure, which provides an ample vista with natural lookout.

The polygonal irregular plan is defined by the walls, reinforced by two towers on the north and southern ends of the structure. The height of the walls vary between three and five metres in height, while the structure is approximately 1.5 metres thick.

The wall outcroppings on the western, and northwestern exposures show elements of barbicans, that extend one metre in height. There is one unique opening in the northeast, which provides access to the schist cliffs. The towers are massive, distinct in form and incomplete: the north tower is circular, with a diameter of 4.99 metres (16.4 ft) and 9 metres (30 ft) exterior height; the rectangular southern tower, 4.98 metres (16.3 ft) by 4.40 metres (14.4 ft) has the same height as its northern neighbour. In the parade ground, there are several excavations encountered along the northwest walls. This includes the rounded cistern, with vaulted ceiling and interior completed filled-in. Near the entrance, is a commemorative inscription that marks the 100-year period of the castle's restoration.

There is some belief, although unproven, that the castle was the one represented on the national flag.
