= Aljezur (parish) =

- Civil parish
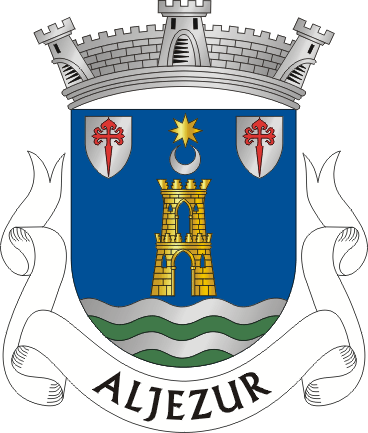
- Coat of arms

- Location in Portugal
- Coordinates: 37.316°N 8.804°W
- Country: Portugal
- Region: Algarve
- Intermunic. comm.: Algarve
- District: Faro
- Municipality: Aljezur

Area
  - Total: 166.76 km^{2} (64.39 sq mi)

Population (2011)
  - Total: 3,365
  - Density: 20.18/km^{2} (52.26/sq mi)
- Time zone: UTC+00:00 (WET)
  - Summer (DST): UTC+01:00 (WEST)
- Postal code: 8670
- Website: Page on CM Aljezur website

Aljezur is a parish (freguesia) in the municipality of Aljezur in Portugal. The population in 2011 was 3,365, in an area of 166.76 km^{2} (64.39 sq mi).

The area consists of Vale da Telha, Arrifana, Espartal, Vales, and Picao de Baixo

Archaeological sites confirm man's presence in the area since prehistoric times, most notably for a period around 4,000 BC and during the Bronze Age. The name Aljezur comes from Aljuzur, the Arabic meaning of Islands. Overlooking the town is a ruin of a Moorish fortress. A visit on the hill and learning about the function and history of this historic monument can be combined with a visit to one of the local museums.

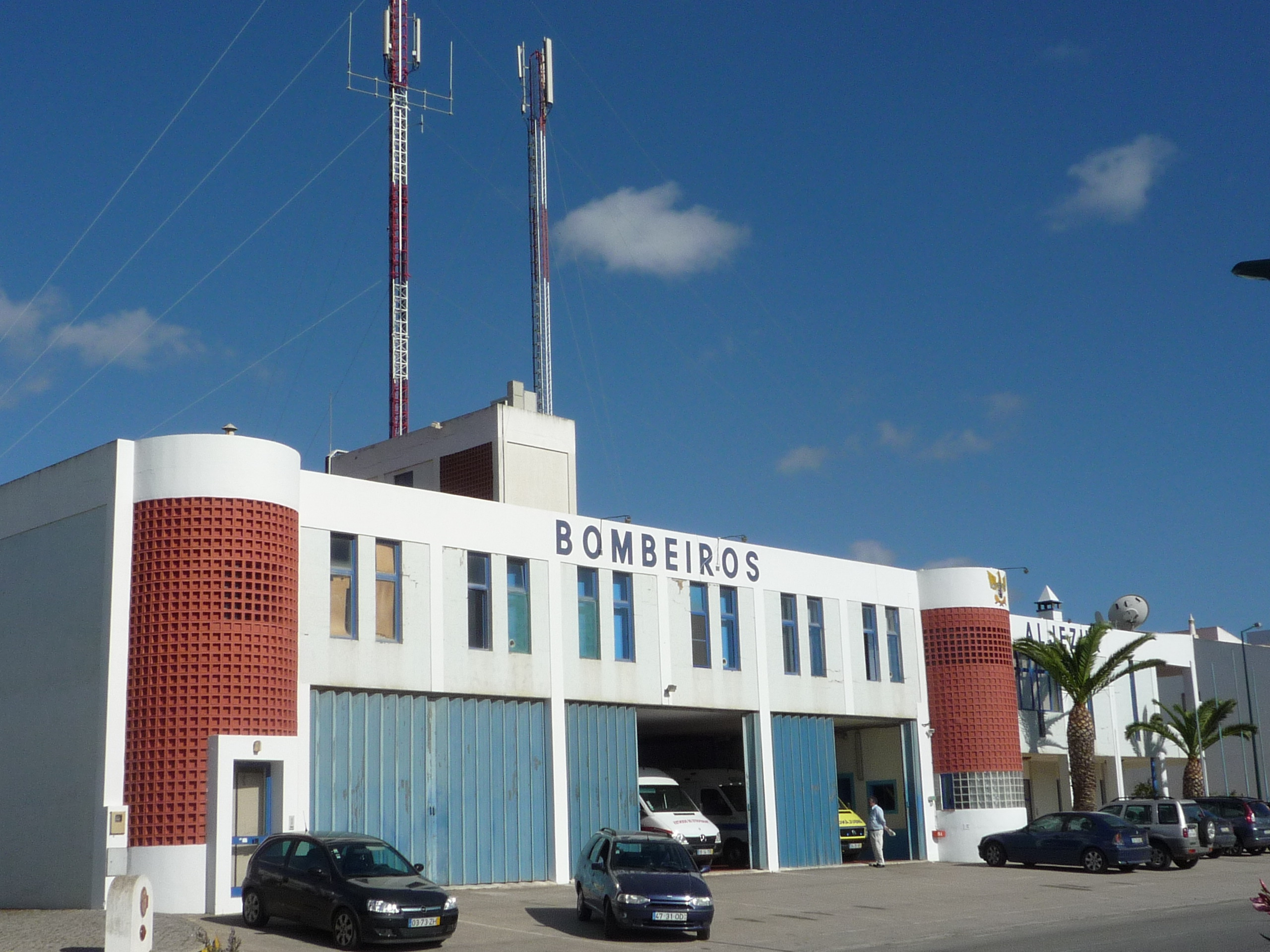
The fire station

== See also ==
- Castle of Aljezur
- Aljezur River
