= Southwest Alentejo and Vicentine Coast Natural Park =

Protected area in southwest Portugal

- IUCN category V (protected landscape/seascape)
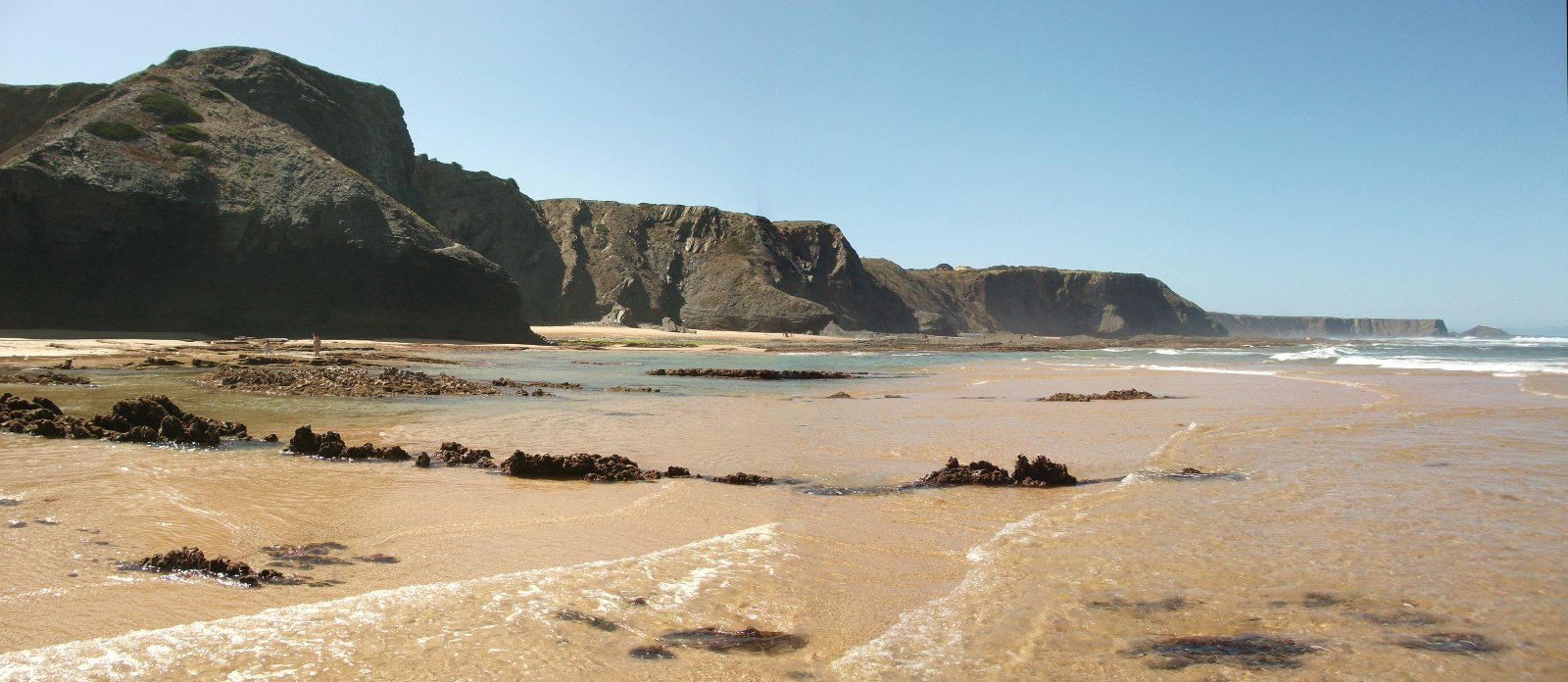
- Interactive map of Southwest Alentejo and Vicentine Coast Natural Park
- Location: Alentejo Litoral & Barlavento Algarvio, Portugal
- Coordinates: 37°27′23″N 8°47′19″W
- Area: 895.7 km^{2} (345.8 sq mi)
- Created: July 7, 1988
- Visitors: 12,718 (in 2017-2020 (average))
- Governing body: ICNF

Southwest Alentejo and Vicentine Coast Natural Park (PNSACV) is a natural park located in southwest Portugal. It occupies an area of 895.7 km^{2} (345.8 sq mi) (605.8 km^{2} (233.9 sq mi) on land and 289.9 km^{2} (111.9 sq mi) at sea) and is one of the last strongholds of the wild European coast. It has one of the highest levels of biodiversity in the country with over 12 endemic species of plant and several bird nesting sites.

The park was created on 7 July 1988 in order to promote the protection and sustainable use of natural resources and other natural, landscape and cultural values while promoting the economic, social and cultural development of the region. Since the last decade, the region has been marked by the expansion of intensive agriculture, either sanctioned or actively promoted by the government via the passing of laws that encourage the creation of new greenhouses to grow crops for the export market, dependant on labour that is often exploited, working in living in precarious conditions, and that damages local fauna, flora and water resources.

The Rota Vicentina is a network of hiking and cycling trails that crosses the Southwest Alentejo and Vicentine Coast Natural Park. Two hiking routes of the Rota Vicentina are especially popular:

- The Trilho dos Pescadores or Fishermen's Trail between São Torpes, Porto Covo and Lagos. It's a 226,5 km coastal trail, divided into 13 sections, with in average, moderate difficulty. Hikers on this trail greet each other with the words "Happy fishing" to wish each other a good hiking day (similar to what hikers say on the Camino de Santiago: "Bien Camino").
- The Caminho Histórico or Historical Way between Santiago do Cacém and Cabo de São Vicente. It's a 263 km trail over rural roads and a classic Grand Route (GR), divided into 13 sections, that's easy to hike. It has twice (2016 and 2020) been certified with the "Leading Quality Trails—Best of Europe" label by the ERA – European Ramblers' Association.
