= Praia do Canal =

Beach in Aljezur, Portugal

- Beach
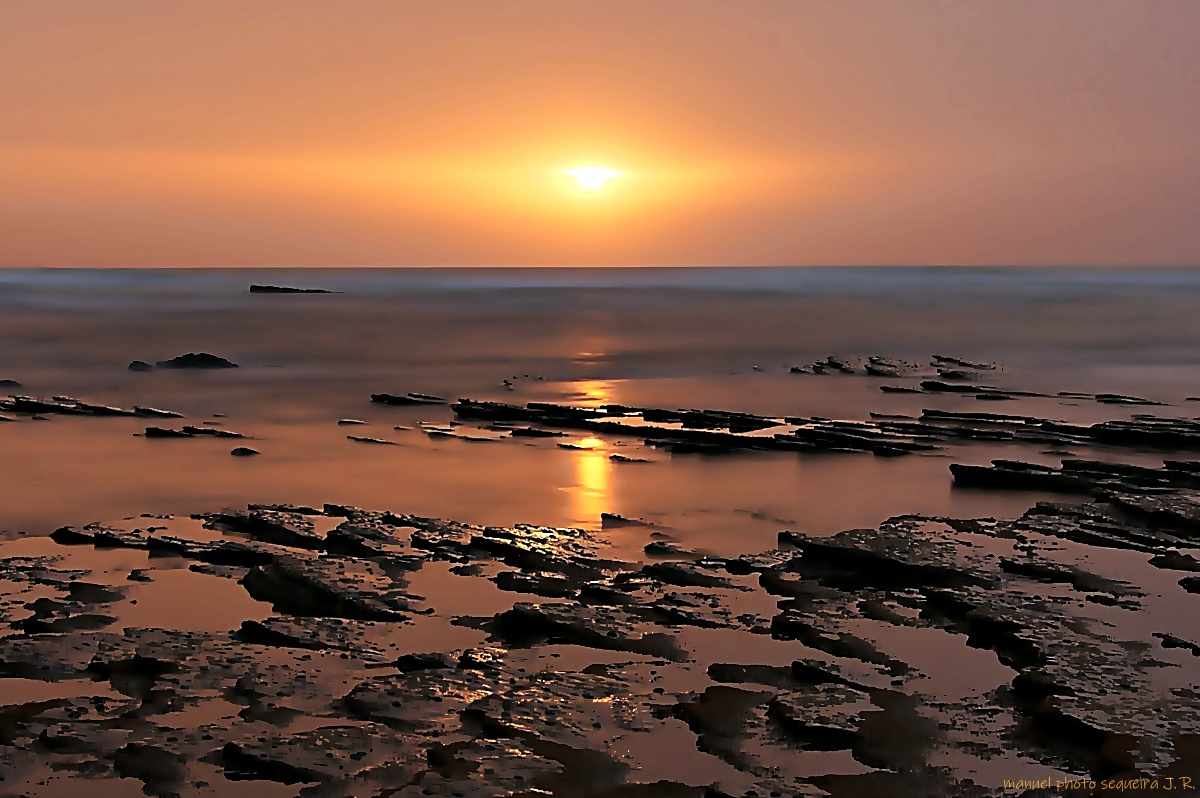
- Praia do Canal

- Praia do Canal
- Coordinates: 37°16′13″N 8°51′35″W
- Location: Aljezur, Algarve, Portugal

Praia do Canal is a beach within the Municipality of Aljezur, in the Algarve, Portugal. The beach is on the western Seaboard in the north west of the Algarve. The beach is 6.7 miles (10.8 km) south west of the village of Aljezur, and is 65.6 miles (105.6 km) north west, by road, from the regions capital of Faro. The beach of Praia do Canal is inside the Vicentine Coast Natural Park, an area of outstanding natural beauty.

== Description ==
This beach consists of a mainly pebbles with only a very small area of sand. The beach is mainly used by beach fishermen and surfers At low tide the beach is connected to the sandy beach of Praia de Vale Figueira which is at the southern end of Praia do Canal
