= Praia do Penedo =

Beach in Aljezur, Portugal

- Beach
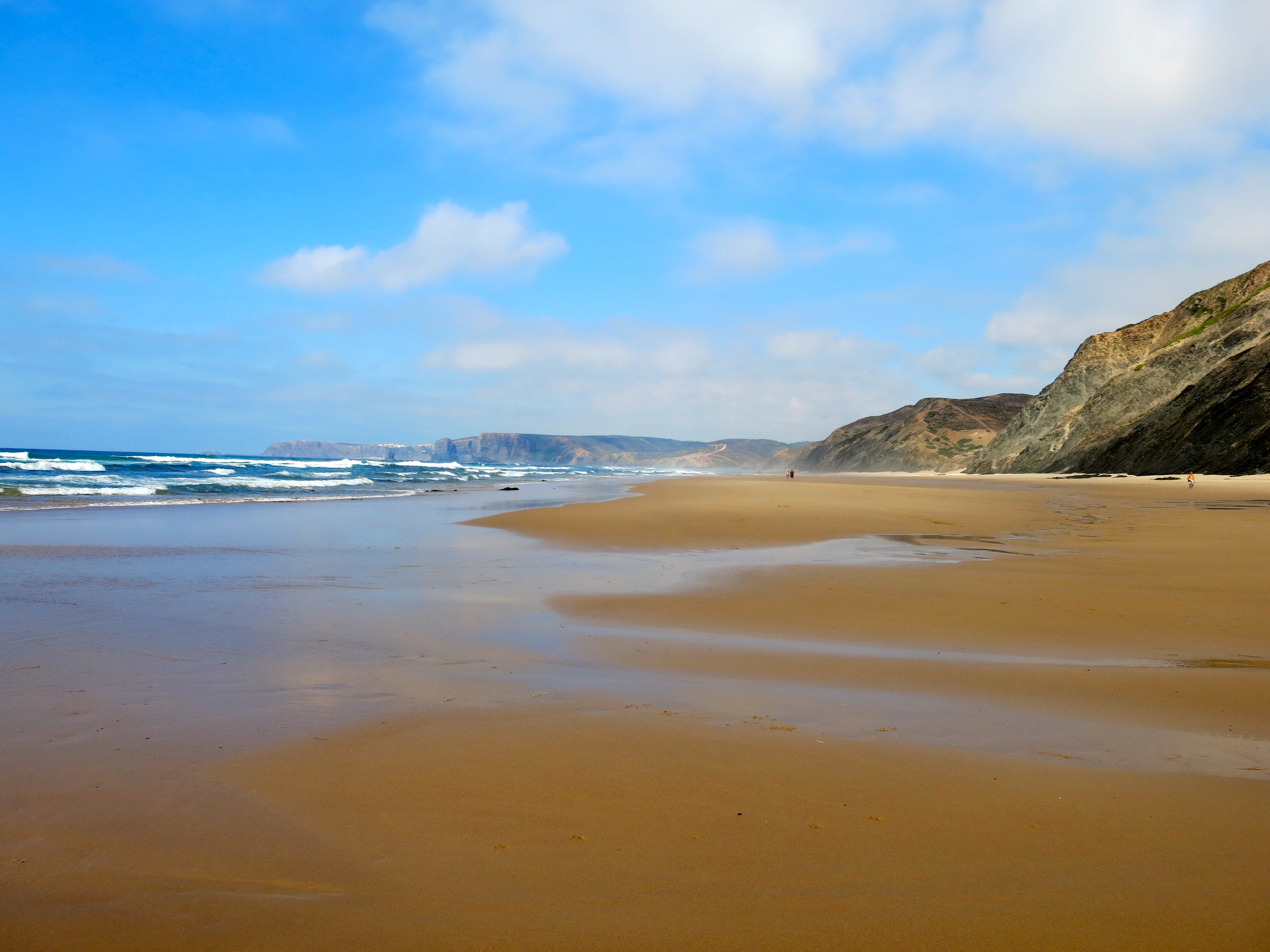
- Praia do Penedo

- Praia do Penedo
- Coordinates: 37°16′32″N 8°51′43″W
- Location: Aljezur, Algarve, Portugal

Praia do Penedo is a beach within the Municipality of Aljezur, in the Algarve, Portugal. The beach is on the western Seaboard in the north west of the Algarve. The beach is 6.7 miles (10.8 km) south west of the village of Aljezur, and is 65.6 miles (105.6 km) north west, by road, from the regions capital of Faro. The beach of Praia do Penedo is inside the Vicentine Coast Natural Park, an area of outstanding natural beauty.

== Description ==
The beach of Praia do Penedo is dominated by steep cliffs covered in vegetation and not a building to be seen. This beach consists of pebbles and area of sand with a few rock formations. The beach is mainly used by beach fishermen but is also frequented by a few surfers. From the beach looking north west is the stacked rock island of Pedra da Agulha.

== Getting there ==
This is a difficult beach to find, and the best way to get here is via the beach to the south which is called Praia do Canal. You must turn west of the EN128 in to a lane with a handwritten signpost of which only the first short length is tarmac. To get to this beach you must drive, ideally in a 4X4, for about 5 km on a rutted track which is in bad shape in places.

As you near the coast the track descends into a small valley. At the end of this valley is Praia do Canal where you can park. To get to Praia do Penedo head north from here, either via the beach at low tide or there are trails over the cliffs.
