= Praia de Odeceixe Mar =

Beach in Portugal

Praia de Odeceixe
- Beach
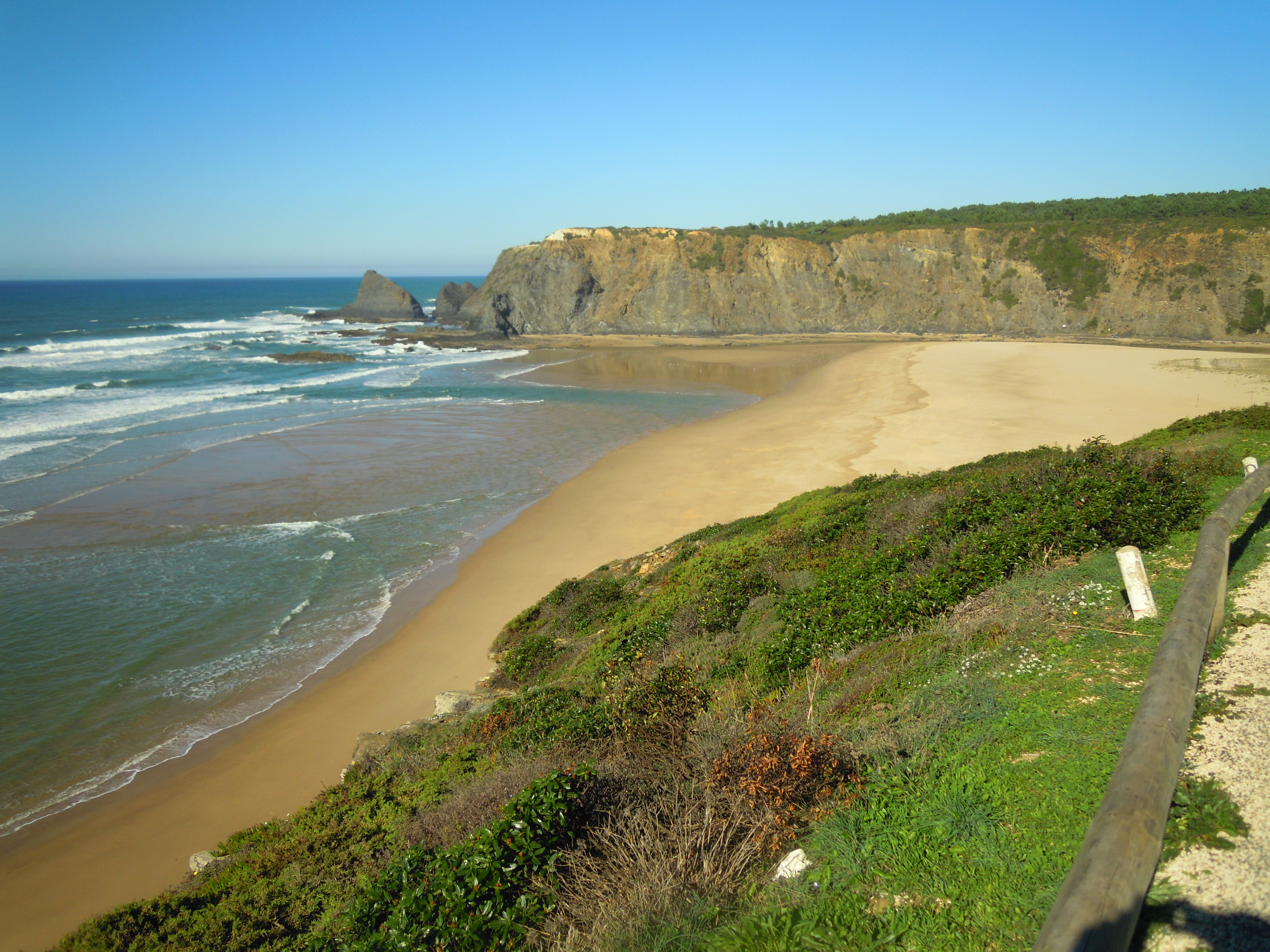
- Praia de Odeceixe

- Location of Praia de Odeceixe
- Coordinates: 37°26′32″N 8°47′52″W
- Location: Aljezur, Algarve, Portugal

Praia de Odeceixe is a beach and small settlement within the Municipality of Aljezur, in the Algarve, Portugal. The beach is on the western seaboard in the extreme northwest of the Algarve. It is in the Vicentine Coast Natural Park. The beach is 2.1 miles (3.4 km) west of the village of Odeceixe, and is 77.9 miles (125.4 km) northwest, by road, of the region's capital of Faro. In 2012 Praia de Odeceixe was designated a blue Flag beach.

== Description ==
The main beach of Praia de Odeceixe is situated at the mouth of the Rio de Seixe (River Seixe), right on the border between the Algarve and the Alentejo. This sandy beach is on the southern side of the outflow to the sea. The northern side of the river has a backdrop of steep cliffs which shelter the beach. To the south of the main beach is a small cove with a sandy satellite beach called Praia de Adegas which has been designated a naturist beach. Also to the south of the main beach is the small village of Praia de Odeceixe, from where a steep path descends to the beach.

== Gallery ==
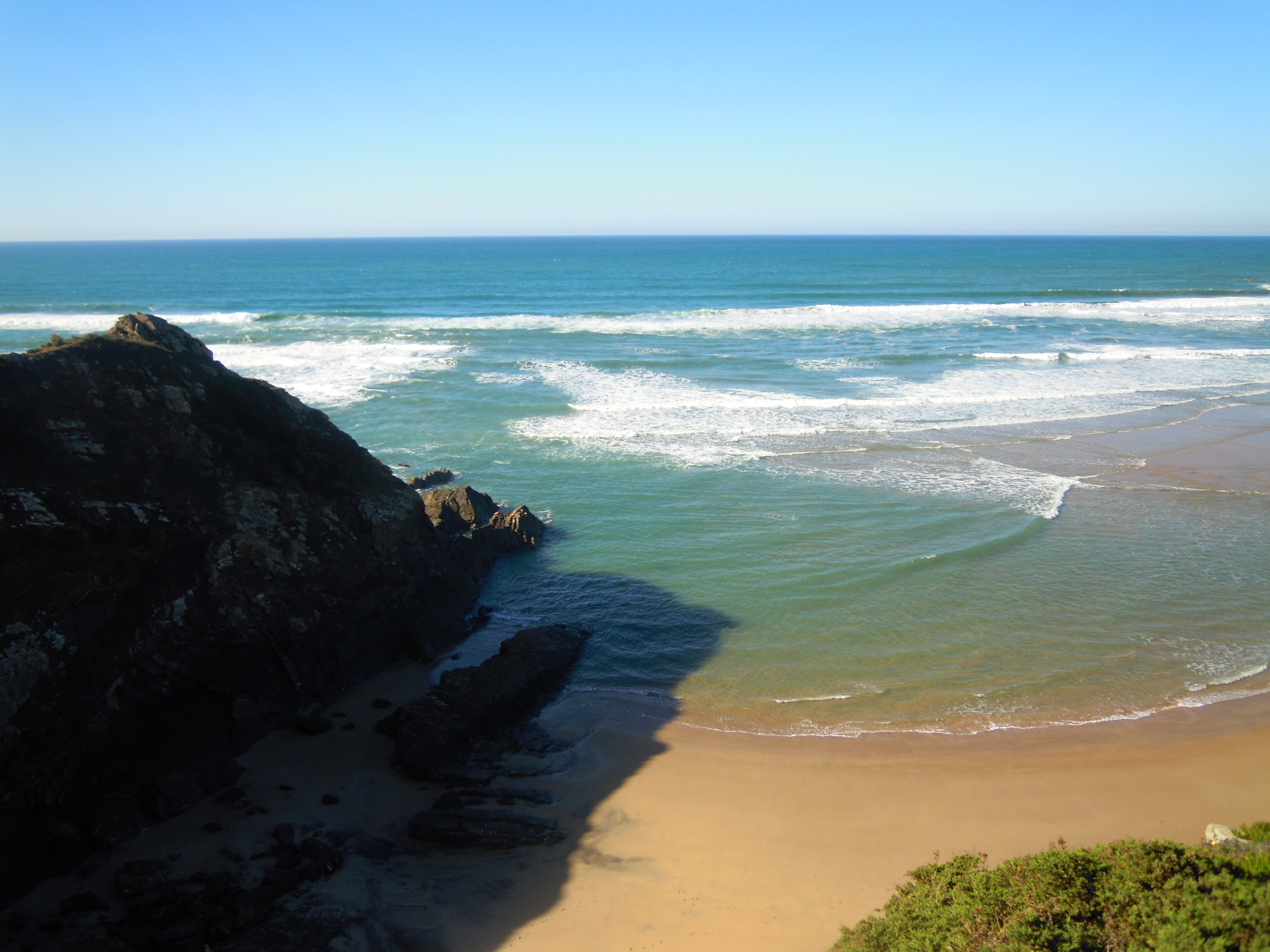
The southern end of the Praia de Odeceixe Mar.

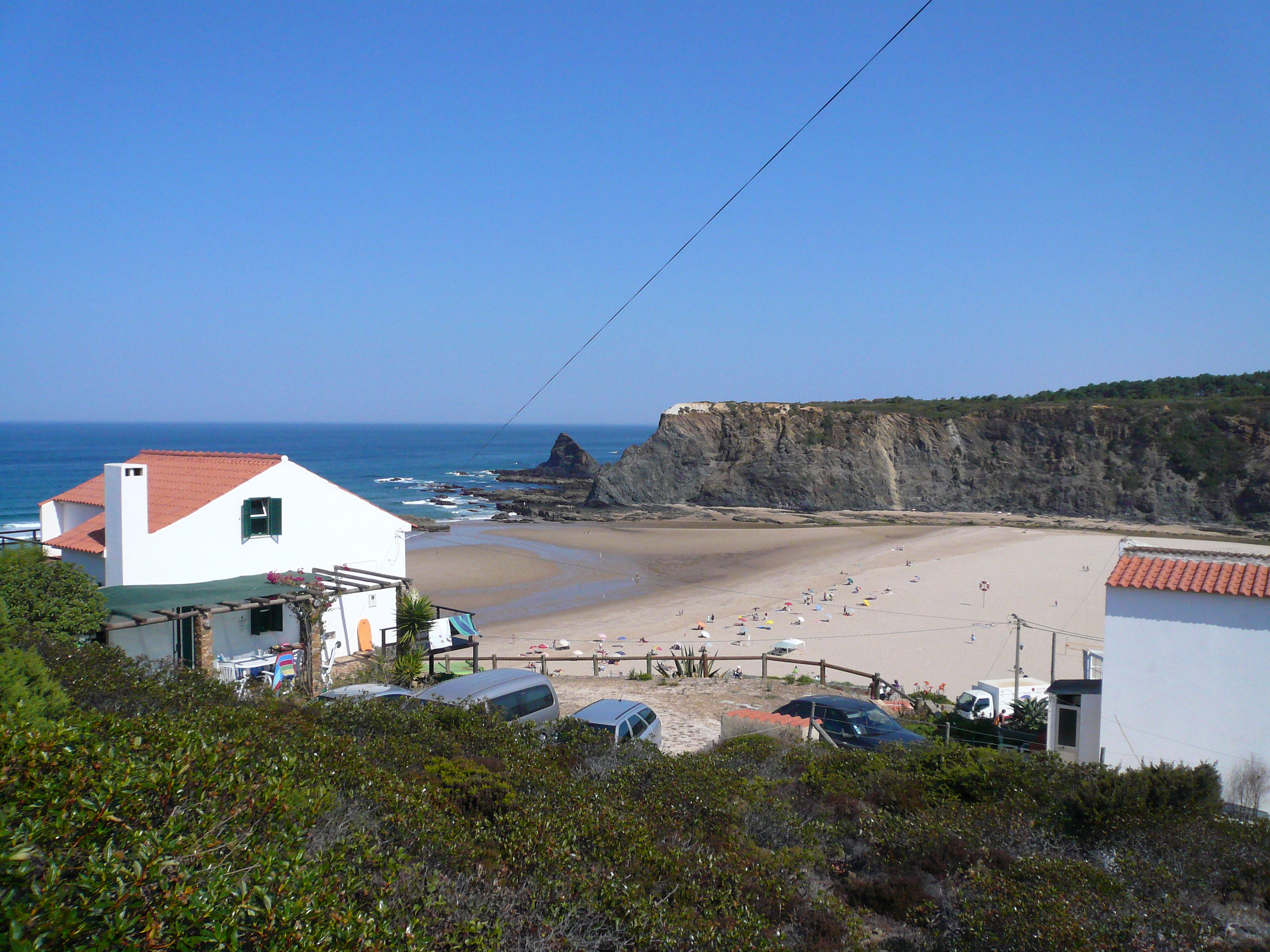

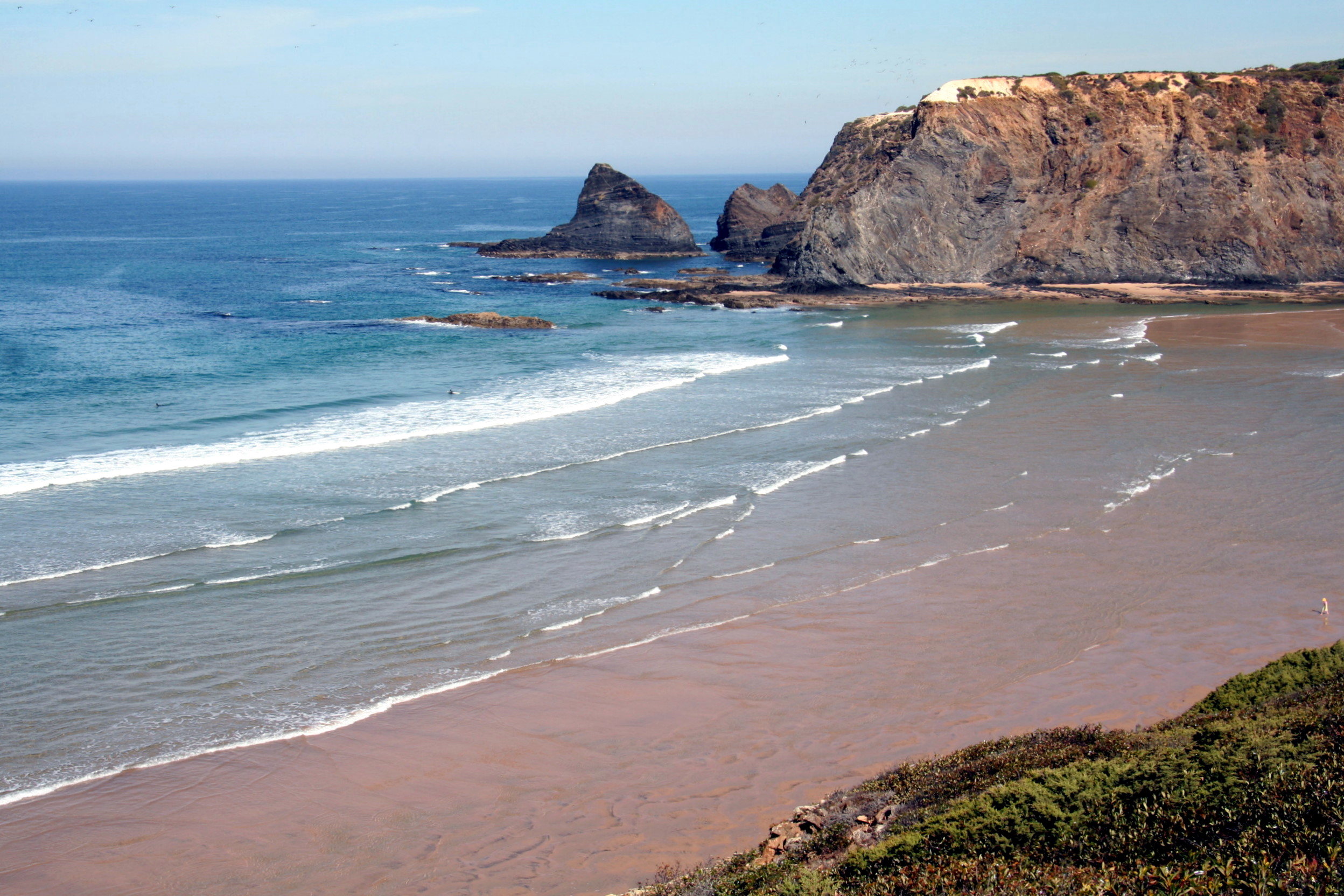

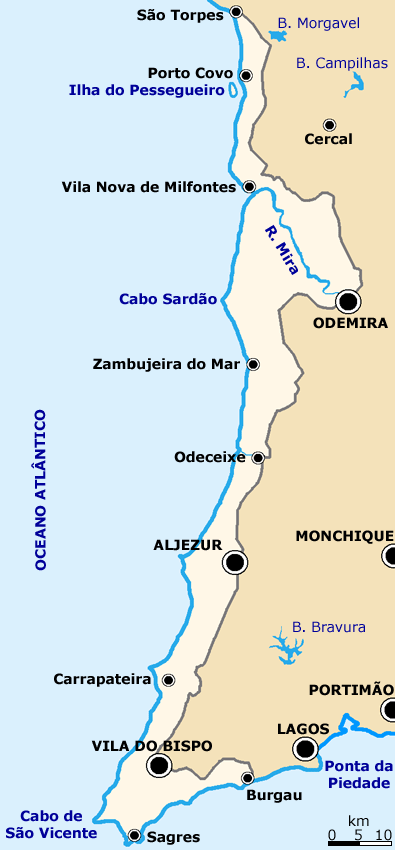
Map of the Vicentine Coast Natural Park

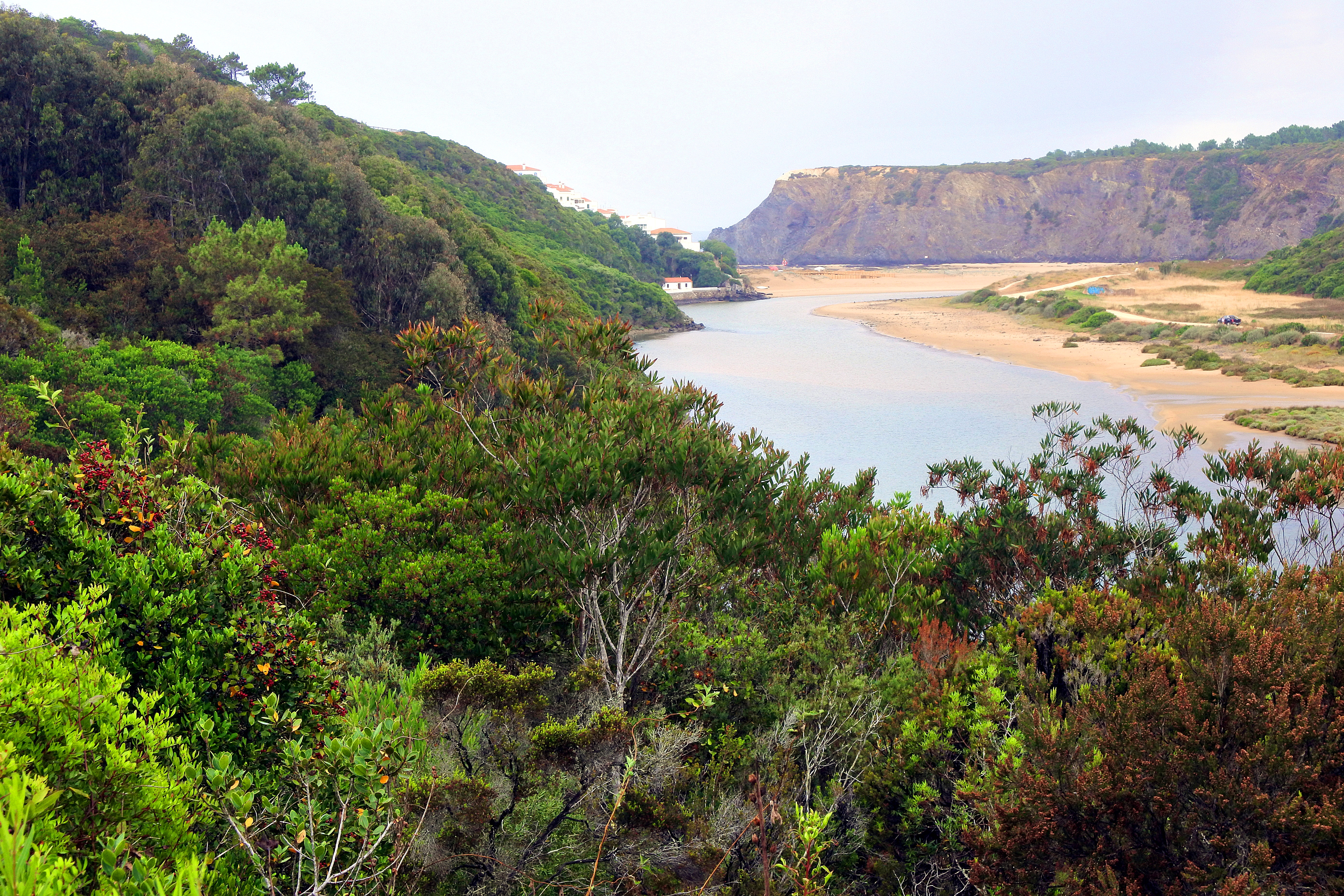

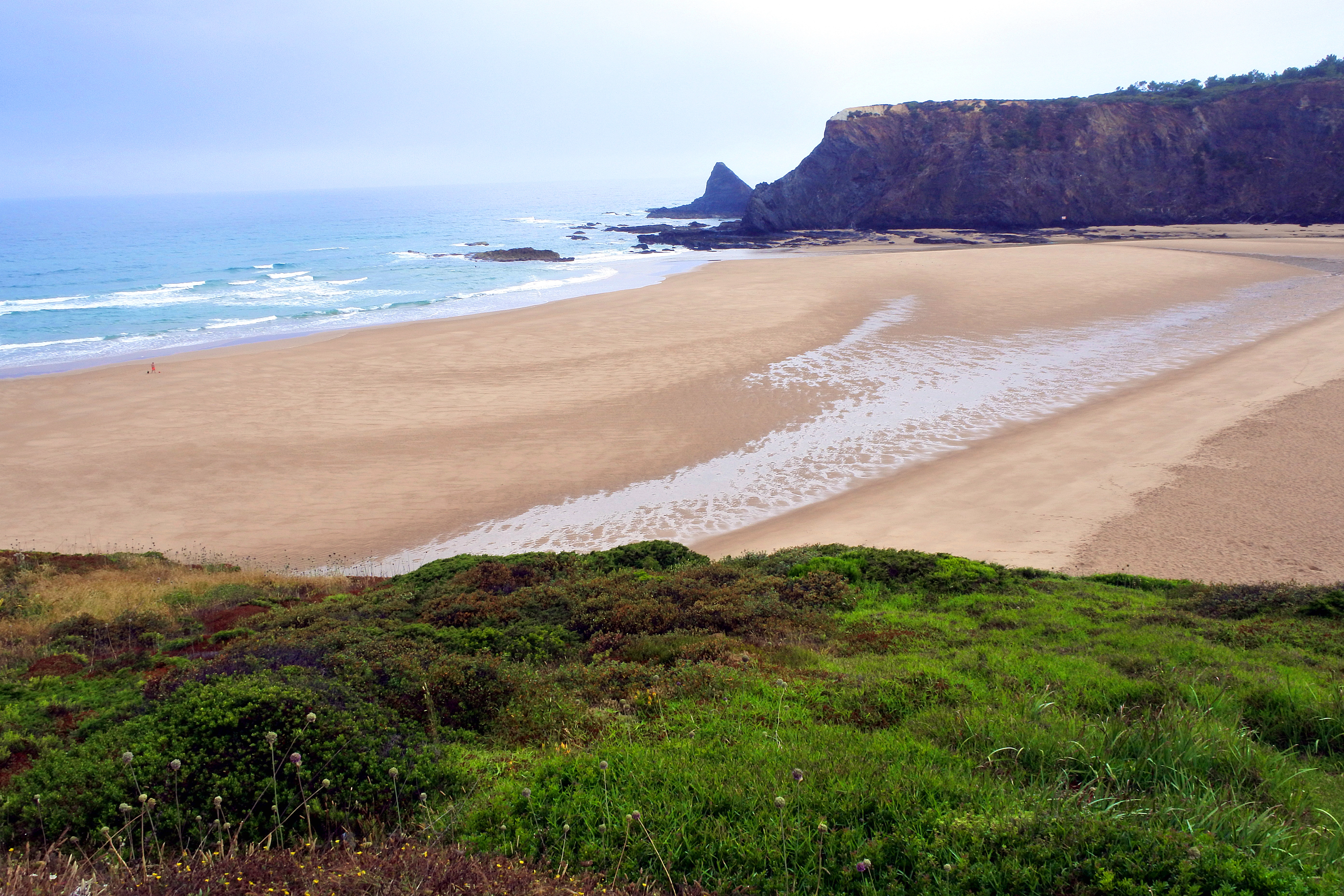

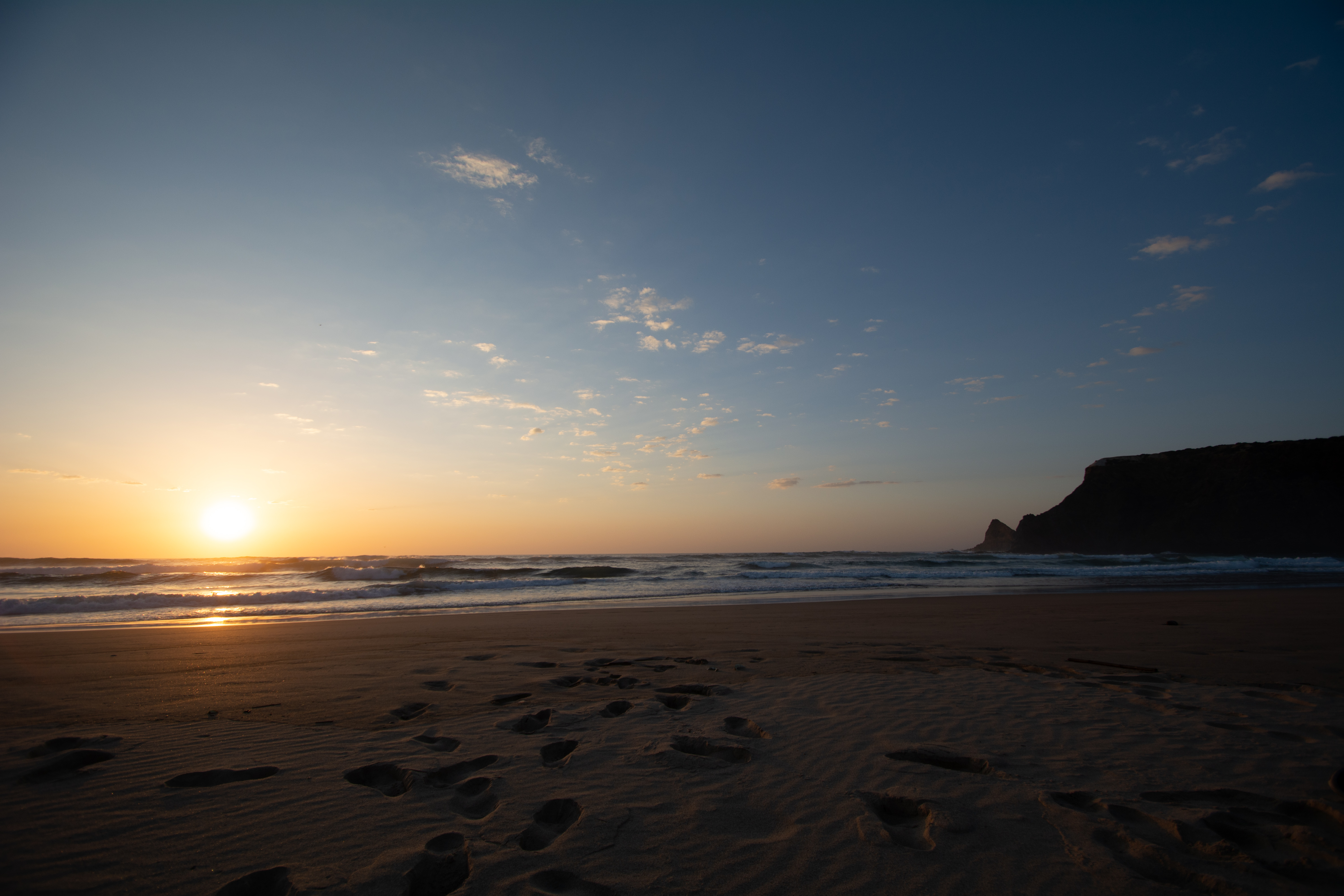

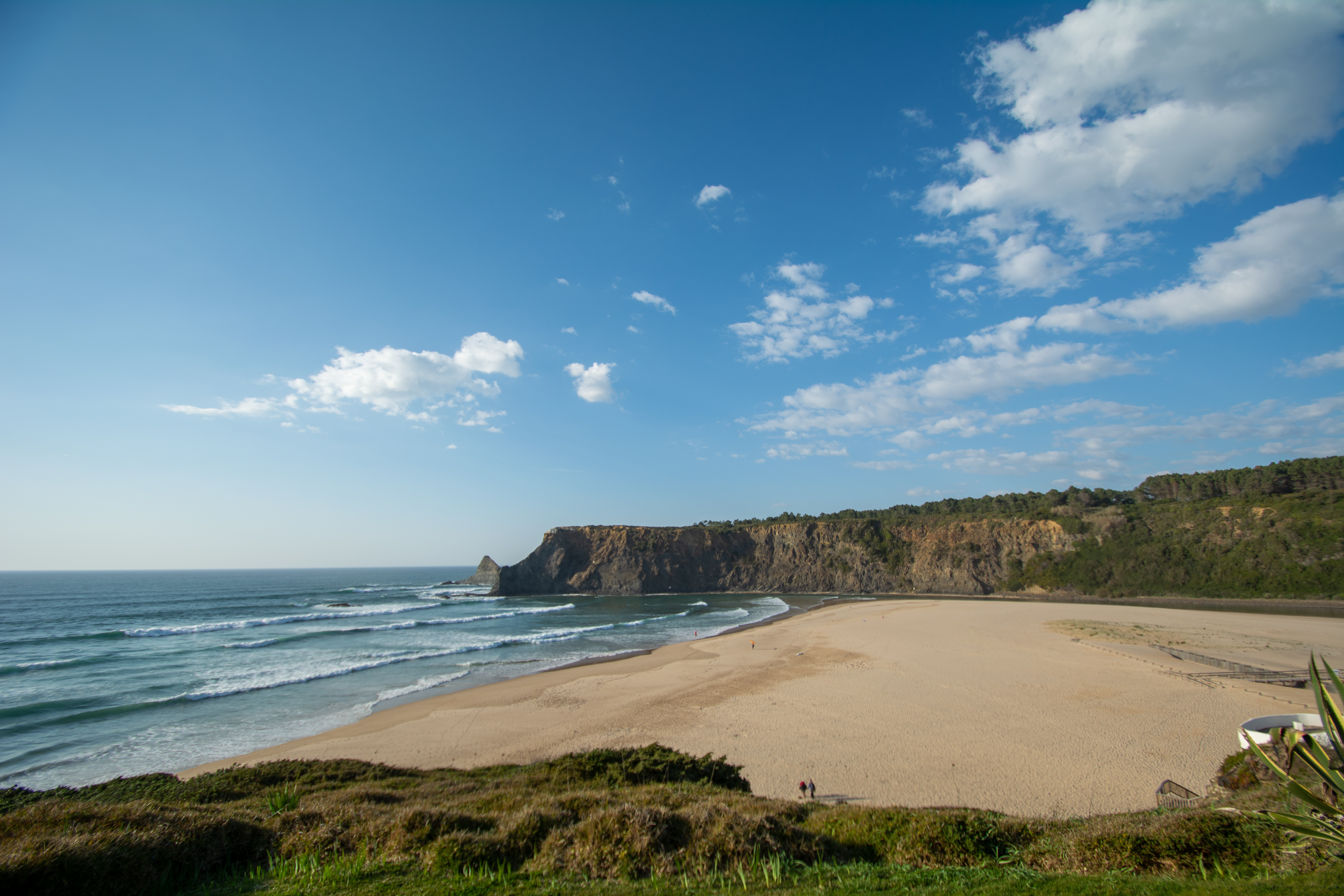

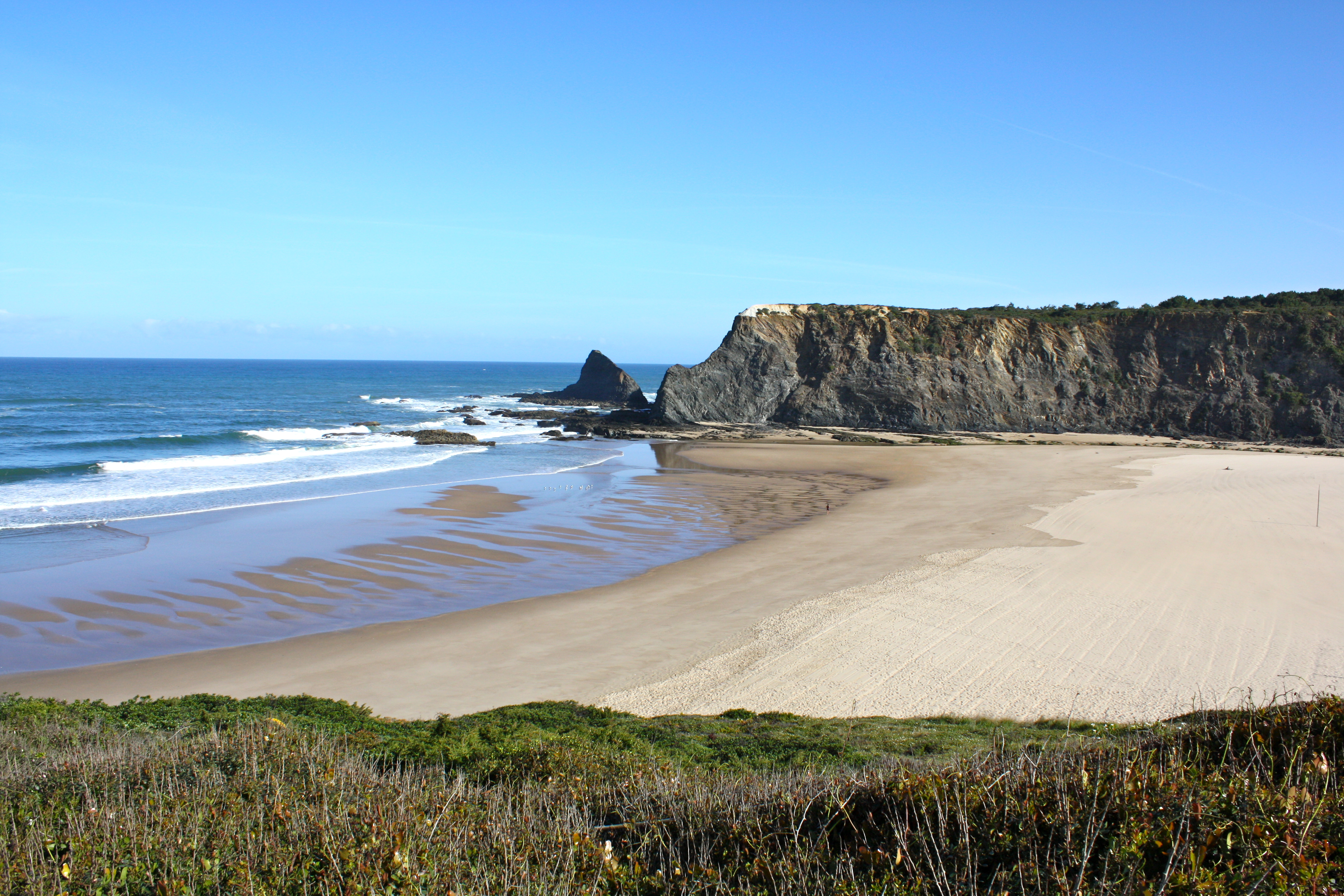

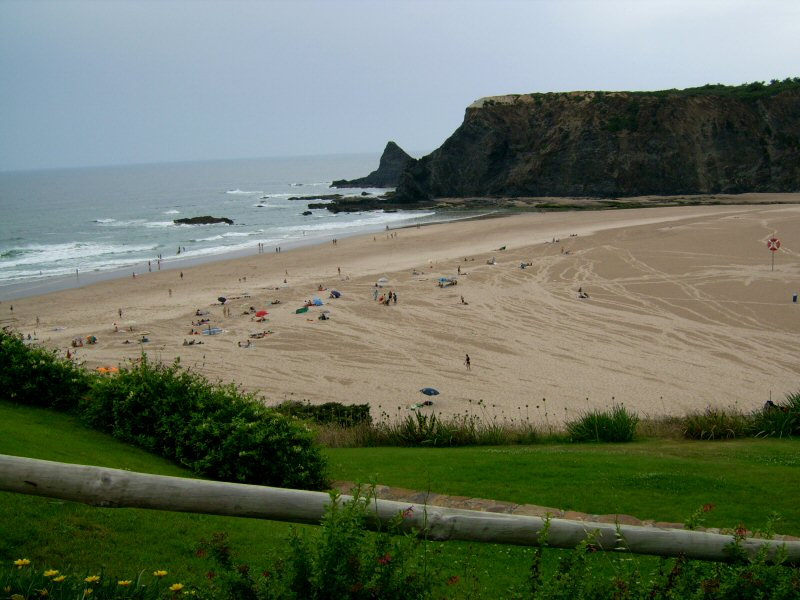

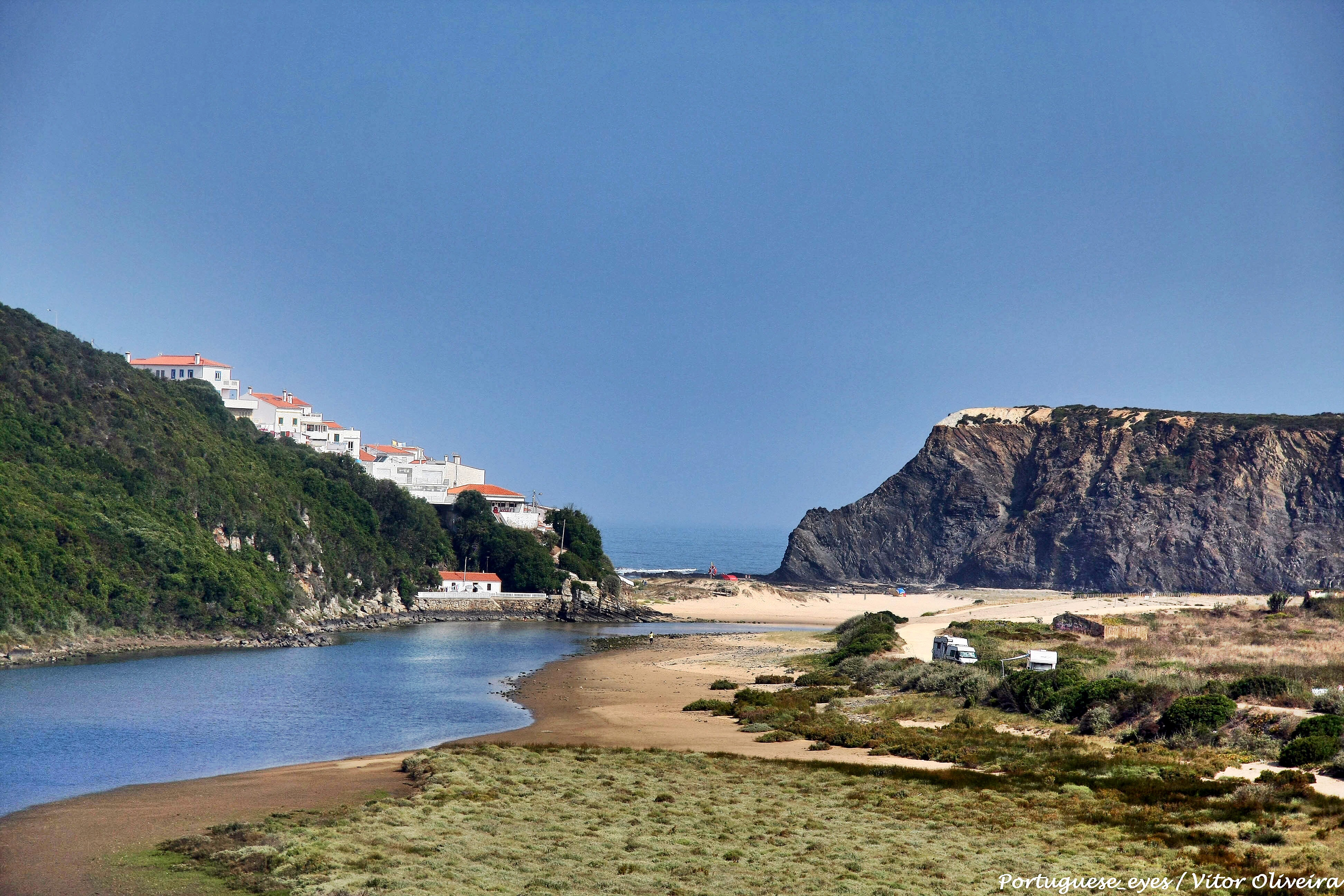

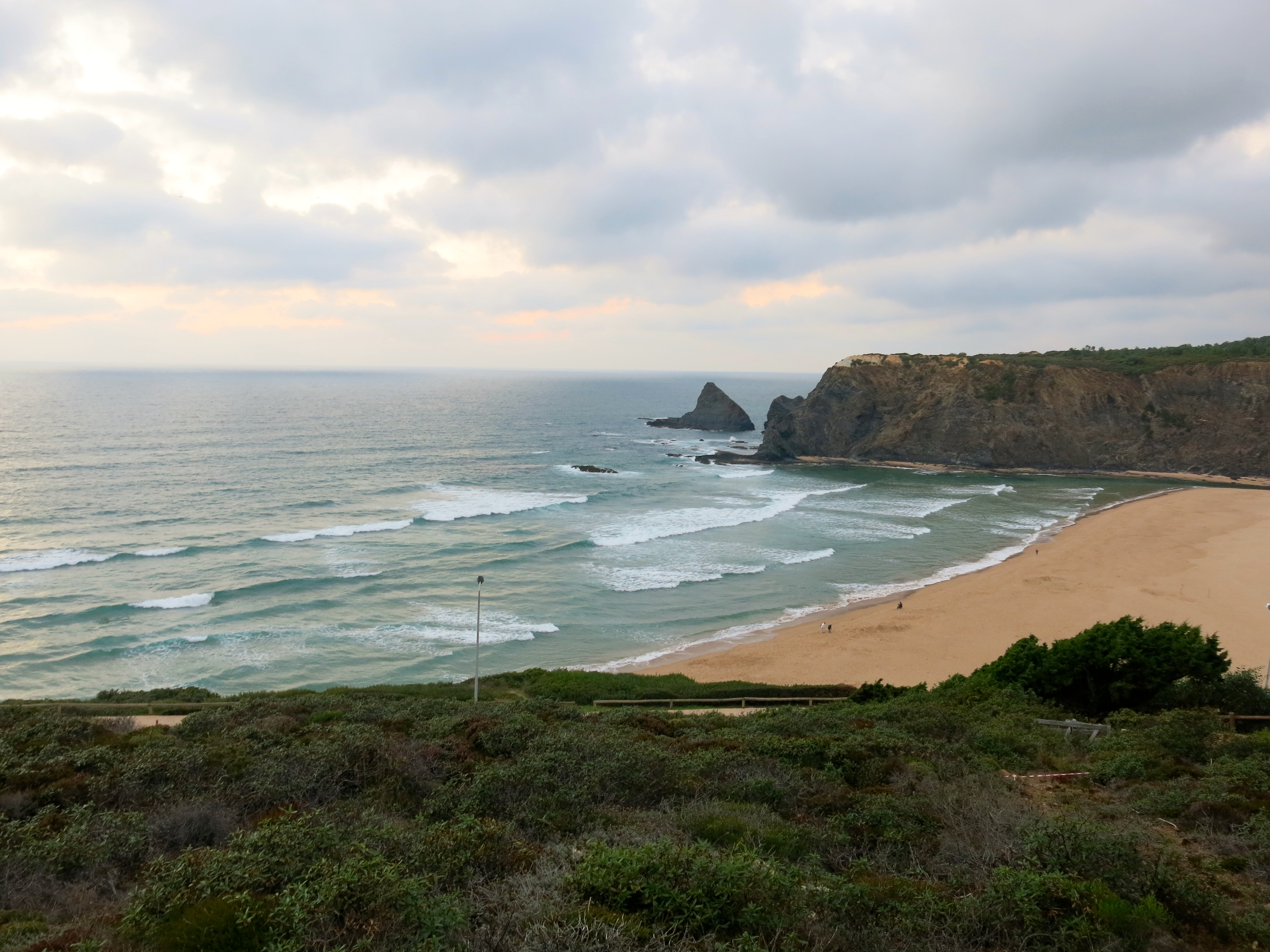
