= Praia da Pipa =

Portuguese beach

- Beach
- Location of Praia da Pipa in Portugal
- Coordinates: 37°19′26″N 8°52′9″W
- Location: Aljezur, Algarve, Portugal

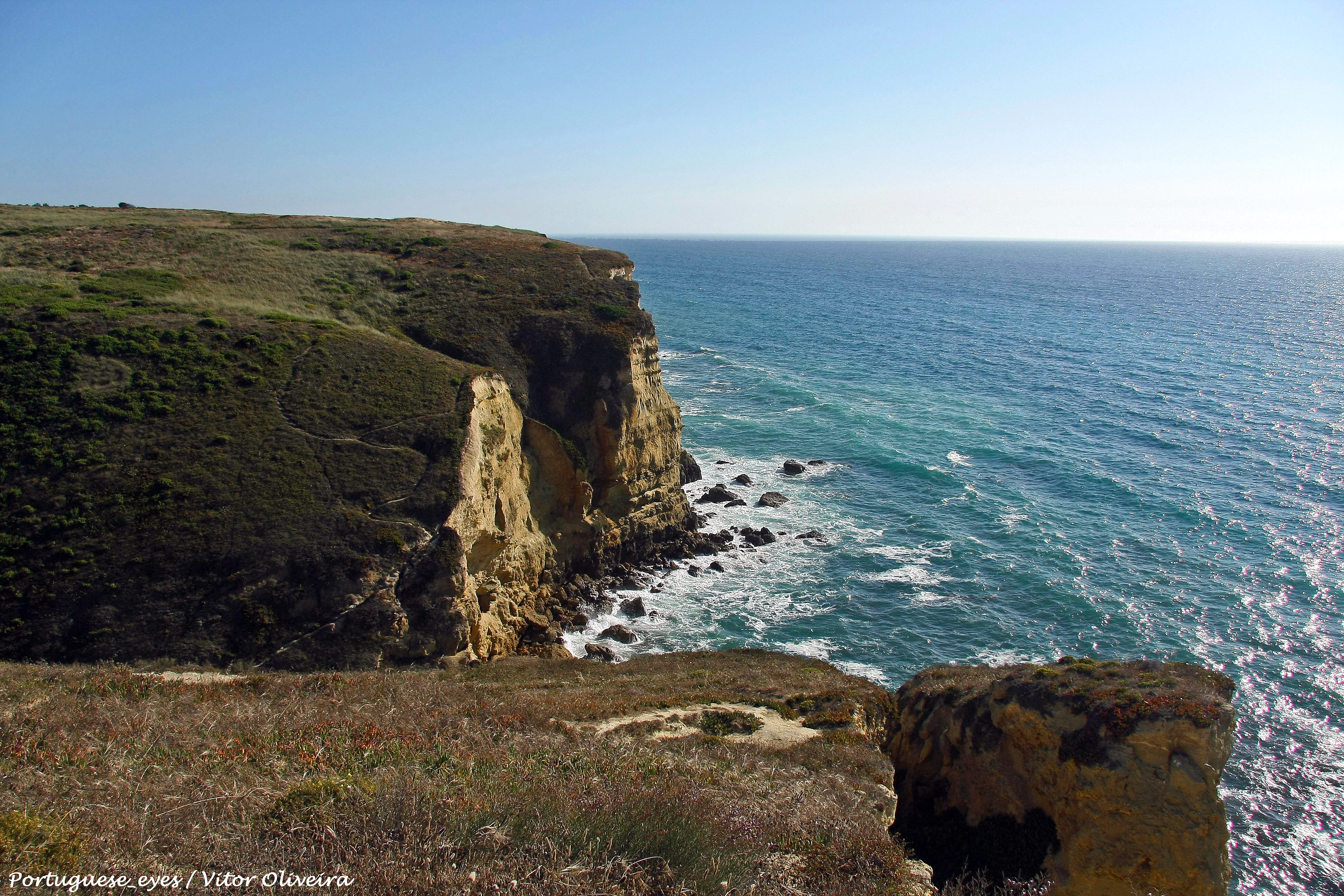
Praia da Pipa - Portugal (

Praia da Pipa is a beach within the Municipality of Aljezur, in the Algarve, Portugal. The beach is on the western Seaboard in the north west of the Algarve. The beach is 6.8 miles (10.9 km) south south west of the village of Aljezur, and is 71.7 miles (115.4 km) north west, by road, from the regions capital of Faro. The beach of Praia da Pipa is inside the Vicentine Coast Natural Park, an area of outstanding natural beauty.

== Description ==
Praia da Pipa is a small sandy beach with steep cliffs to the rear and some interesting rock formations. The beach has very few visitors as it is very difficult to access from the landward side and is mainly visited by fishermen by boat. The beach is sometimes called Medo da Pipa. At the southern end of the beach the coastline curves westward to a rock point which is called the Ponta da Atalaia.

=== Archaeological site ===
On the cliff top of Ponta da Atalaia is the site of a Moorish archaeological site. What remains here is part of the Castle Arrifana site, which is split into two areas. The archaeologist discovered on this site the ruins of several buildings include three mosques, with their Qibla and Mihrab (Information Leaflet).
