= Aljezur International School =

- Escola Internacional de Aljezur
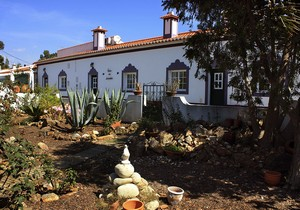
- Aljezur International School schoolhouse and rose garden

Location
- Sitio de Azenha, Barranco de Vaca, Aljezur; 16km North of A22; 4 km South of Aljezur; Western Algarve; 8670-999; Portugal
- Coordinates: 37°16′29.54″N 8°48′15.08″W

Information
- School type: International Secondary
- Motto: Education with Inspiration (Educação com Inspiração)
- Established: September 2010
- Principal: Karen Whitten
- Years offered: UK years 7 – 11
- Age range: 10 – 17 years of age
- Average class size: Small class sizes
- Education system: Cambridge IGCSE
- Classes offered: Broad and rounded curriculum with an emphasis on the academic, creative and community aspects of education.
- Language: English
- Sports: School grounds, local sports grounds and beach sports.
- Website: aljezur-international.org

Aljezur International School is located a short distance from the town of Aljezur in the western Algarve, Portugal. The school provides secondary education, taught in the English language, to children from 10 – 17 years of age following the Cambridge International syllabus and leading to Cambridge International IGCSE qualifications in a broad range of subjects. Aljezur International School is an accredited Cambridge International Examinations Centre and, as the only open exam centre in the western Algarve, accommodates both internal and external students for IGCSE examinations.

Aljezur International officially opened as the area's first International school in September 2010.

The school houses several classrooms, library, art room, dining room and kitchen, and has access to laboratory facilities, sporting complex and multi-sport gymnasium.

The school serves the municipalities of Aljezur, Lagos, and Vila do Bispo.
