= Praia de Monte Clérigo =

Beach in Algarve, Portugal

Praia do monte Clérigo
- Beach
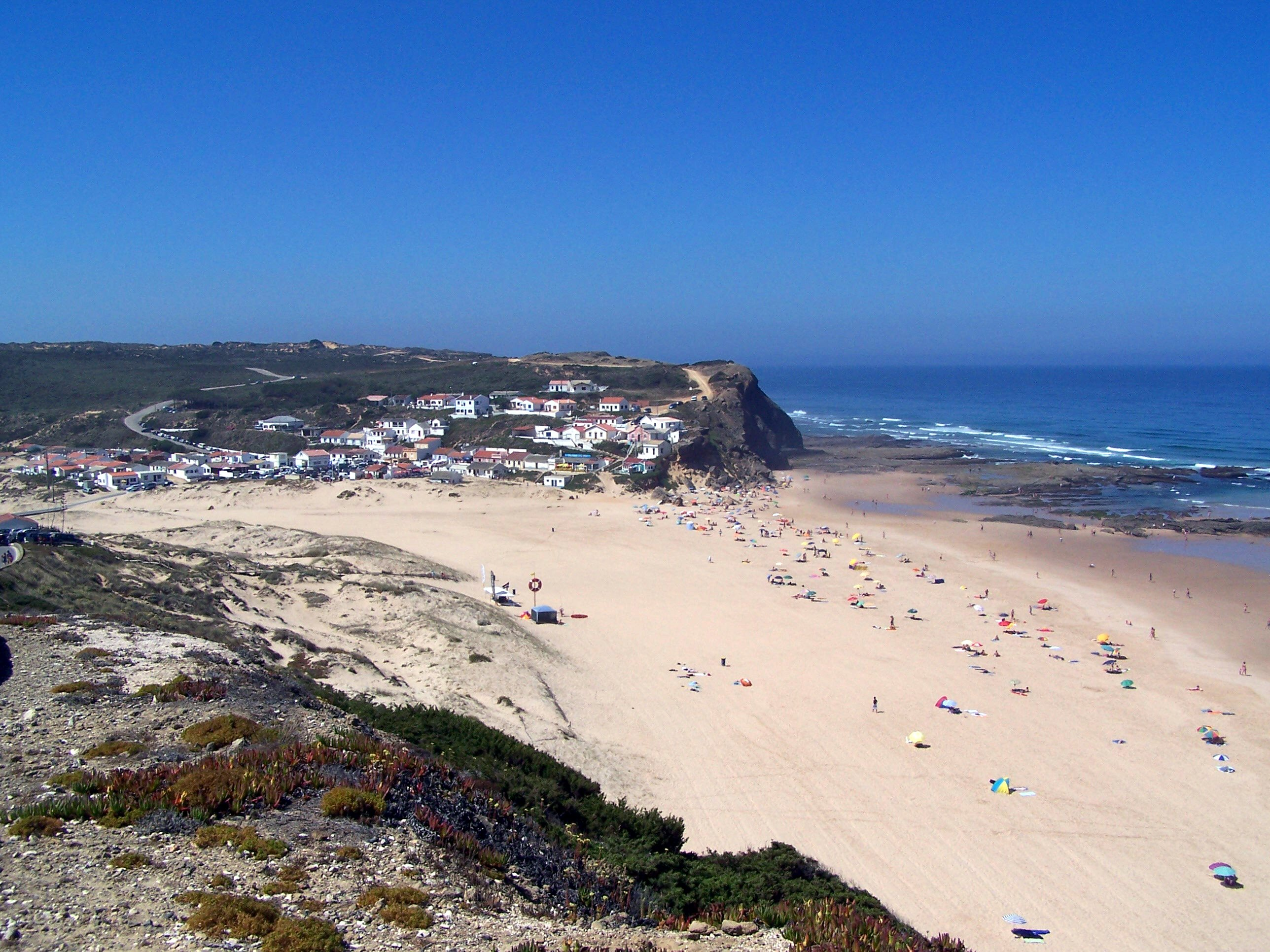
- Praia do monte Clérigo

- Praia do monte Clérigo
- Coordinates: 37°20′27″N 8°51′11″W
- Location: Aljezur, Algarve, Portugal

Praia do monte Clérigo is a beach within the municipality of Aljezur, in Algarve, Portugal. The beach is on the western Seaboard in the north west of the Algarve. The beach is 5.1 miles (8.2 km) north west of the village of Aljezur, and is 70.0 miles (112.7 km) north west, by road, from the regions capital of Faro. Praia do monte Clérigohas been designated a blue Flag beach (2012).

== Description ==
The beach of Praia do monte Clérigo is inside the Vicentine Coast Natural Park, an area of outstanding natural beauty. The beach is near the village of Aljezur and is totally unspoilt by the ravages of tourism. The beach has good access points from the road and car park to the rear of the main beach area. There is a timber ramp and stairways down to the sand. The beach is of fine gold sand and is very clean. The southern end of the beach has unusual and extensive rock formations, amongst which visitors can observe a diverse marine life in the pools and gullies between the rocks. There is an abundance of starfish, crabs, Shrimps and Barnacles. Within the rock crevices at the tide line Octopus can be seen and in the deeper rock pools there are shoals of juvenile fish such as Sea Bream. When the tide is out a shallow lagoon is left on the beach. The lagoon is a safe popular stretch of water both for children and their parents, although in the lagoon visitors should take care as Weever fish can sometimes be found in these waters. These fish sting unaware swimmers if trod on, but the risk is minimal. The sea, when conditions are right, is a popular spot for surfing and bodyboarding, and in the season there is a surf school. Please be aware that there is a strong undertow and current just of the beach. Along the south east fringe of the beach there is an area of sand dunes. Beyond the dunes in the south there is a small settlement of mainly holiday homes. At the northern end of the beach there are panoramic views across this small cove.

== Access for the disabled ==
The local authorities of the beach have taken great steps to make this beach very accessible to disabled people. In the car park some places there are allocated parking bays for disabled drivers displaying a European blue badge. From the car park there is a boardwalk slope, down to, and along the beach which provides easy access for wheelchair users. There is also a Tiralo amphibious wheelchair provided, which makes the beach and the sea accessible, with support, for people with reduced mobility. There is no charge for this service (As of 2012) and allows people with a disability to go on the beach and even near the water (Available only in season between 10:00am to 7:00pm)

== Facilities ==
During the summer season the beach is patrolled by lifeguards. Being an un-commercialised and natural beach here are no concessions for lounger or parasols hire so it is advisable to bring your own on hot sunny days. There are toilets and showers close to the car park. There is also a public telephone and a First Aid Post. Praia do monte Clérigo has good beach restaurants which are called Restaurants O Zé and a Rede.

== Getting there ==
From the town of Lagos take the RN 120 road north towards Sines, Just before the village of Aljezur turn left, signposted to Vale da Telha, Arrifana and a brown sign posted to Praia do monte Clérigo. At the top of the hill turn right and follow the road round to the Praia do monte Clérigo.

== Gallery ==
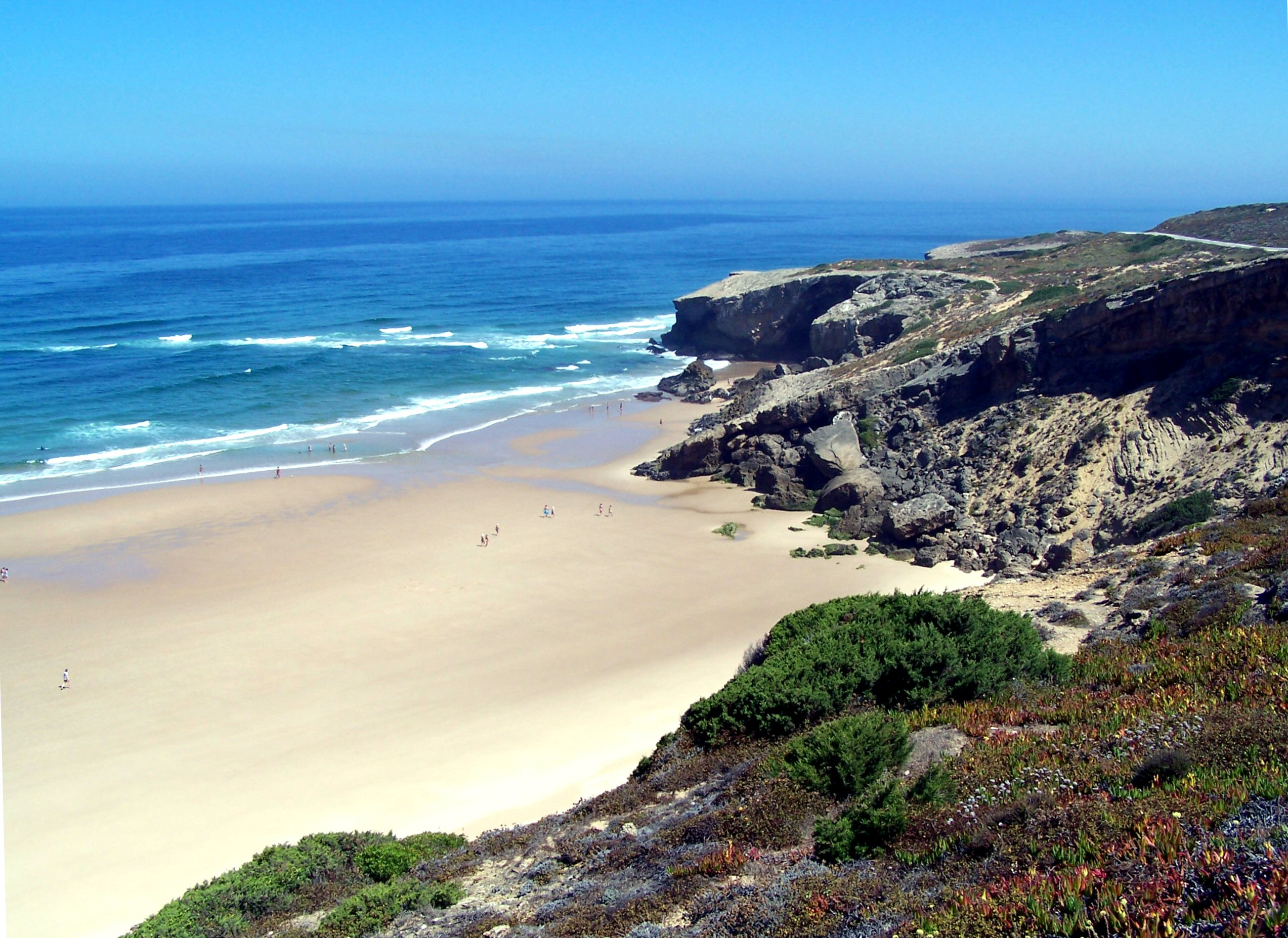
North end of the beach

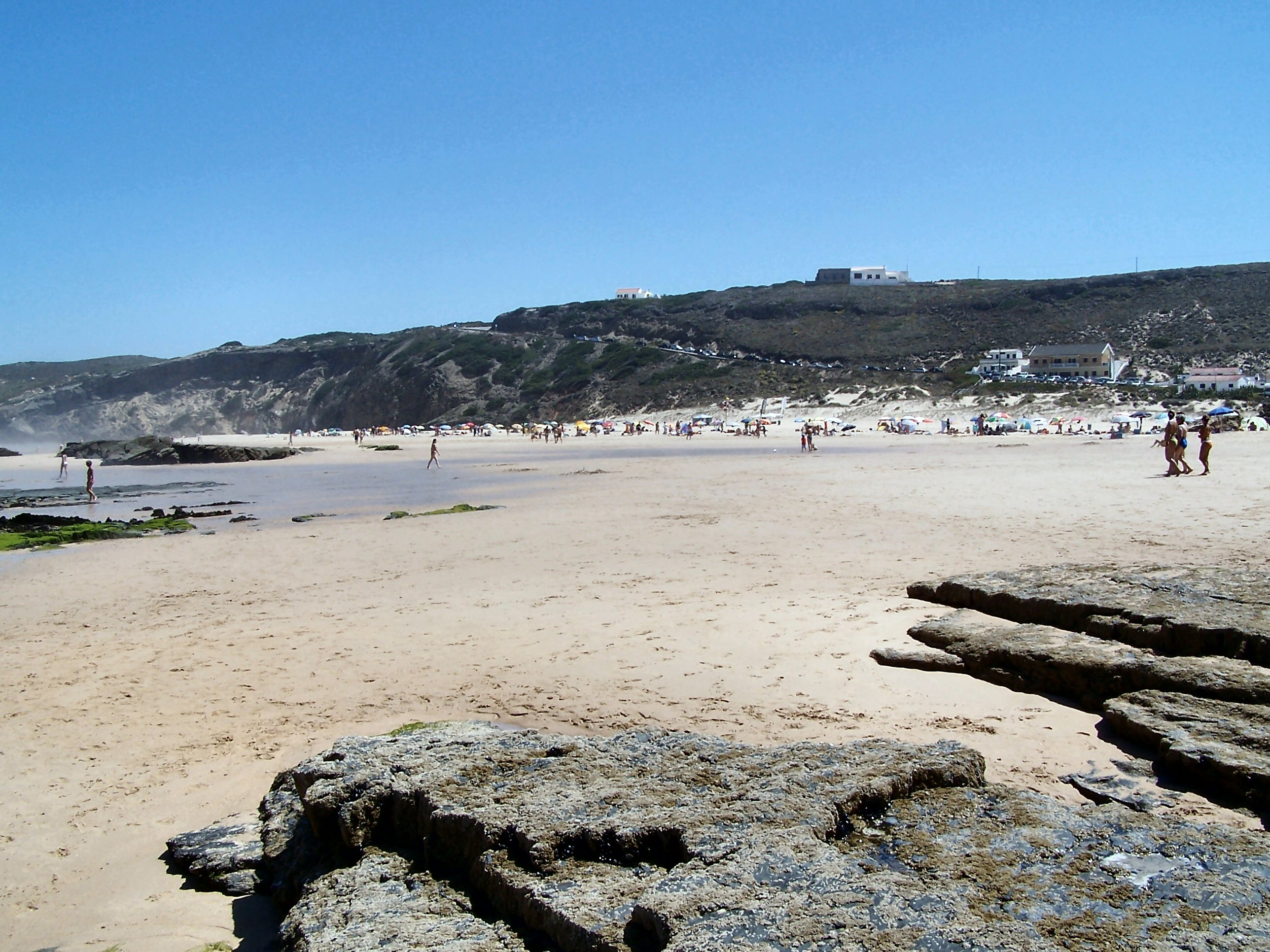
The Beach

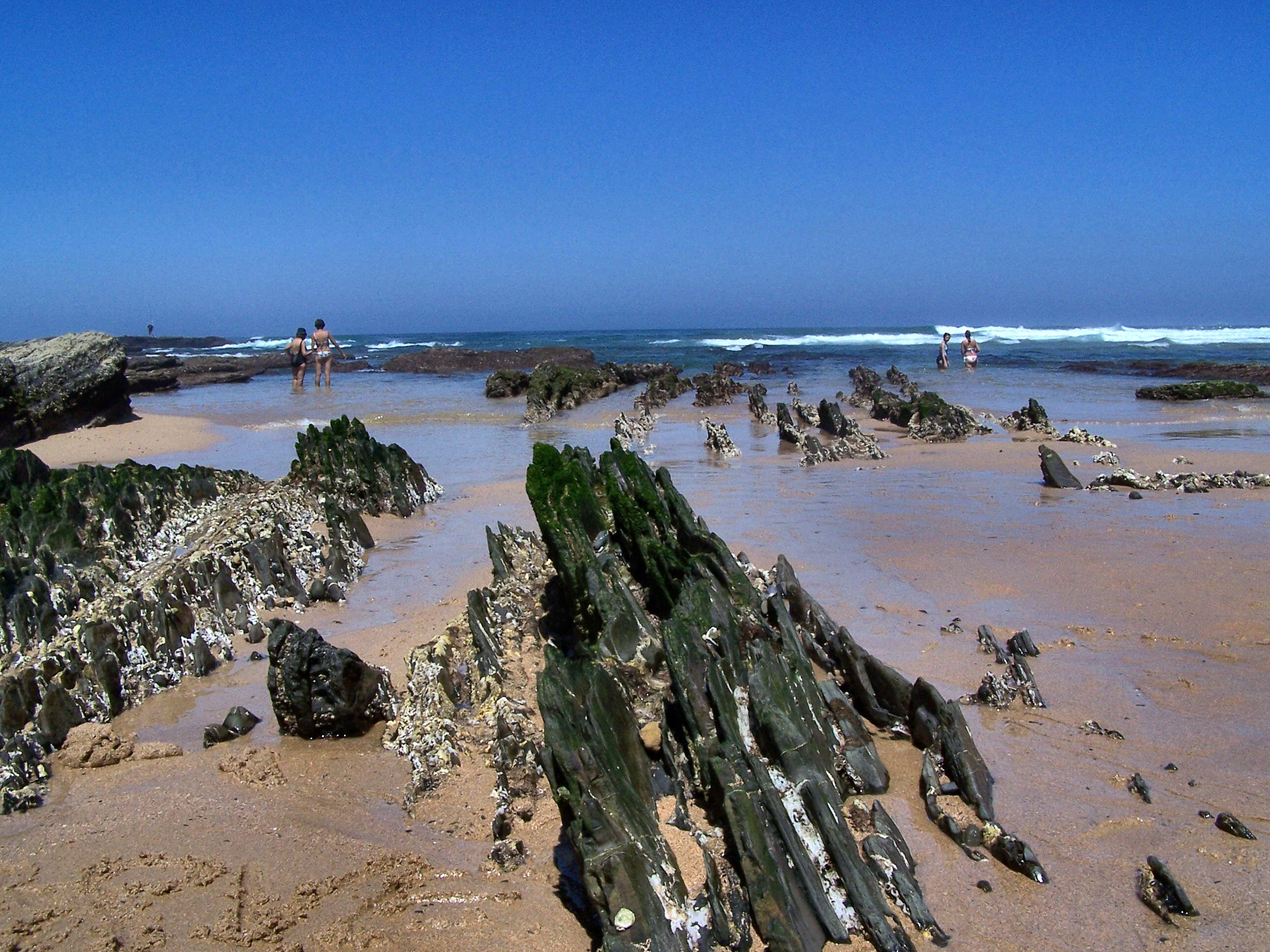
Rock formations on Praia do monte Clérigo

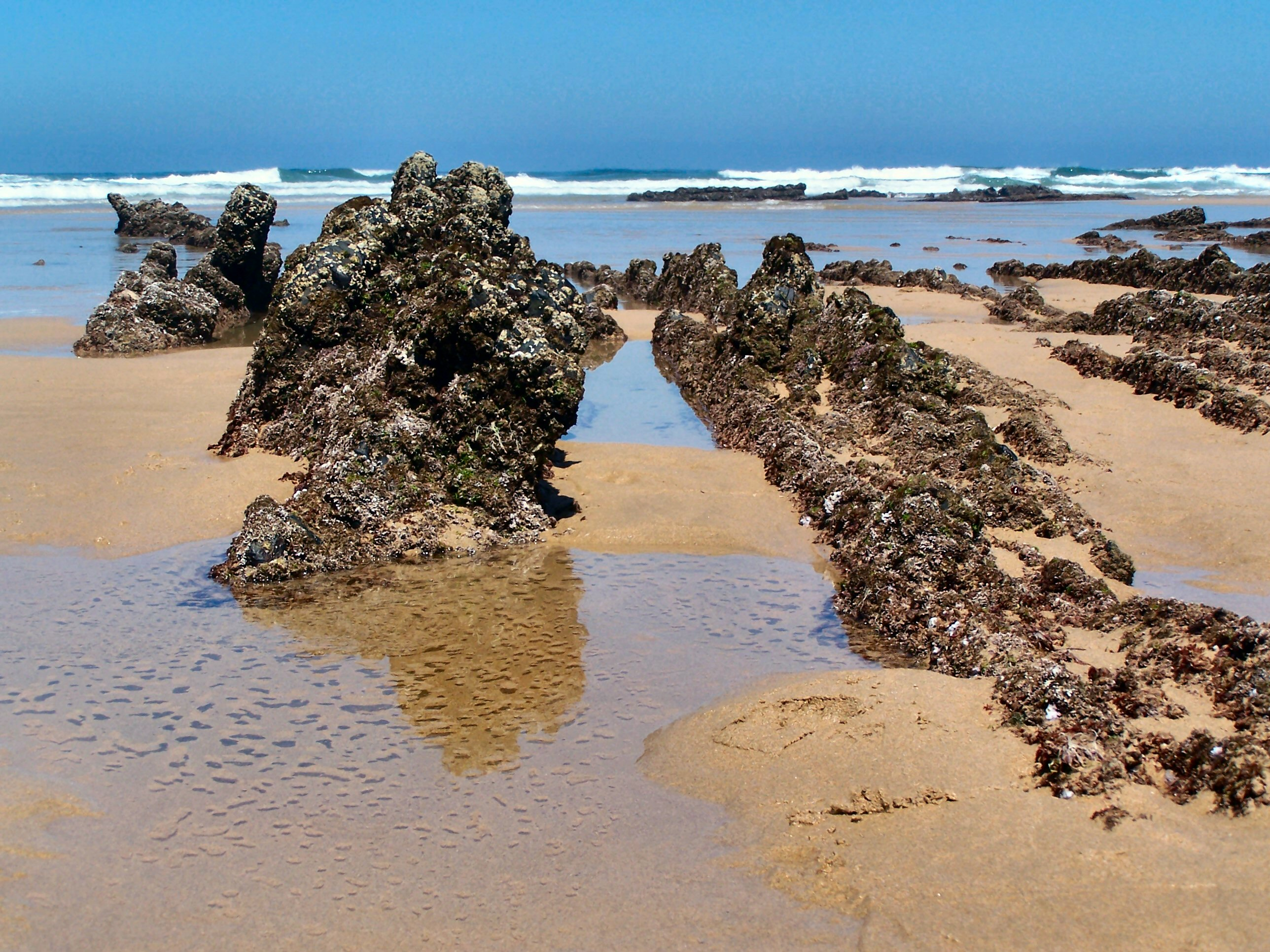
Rock formations on Praia do monte Clérigo

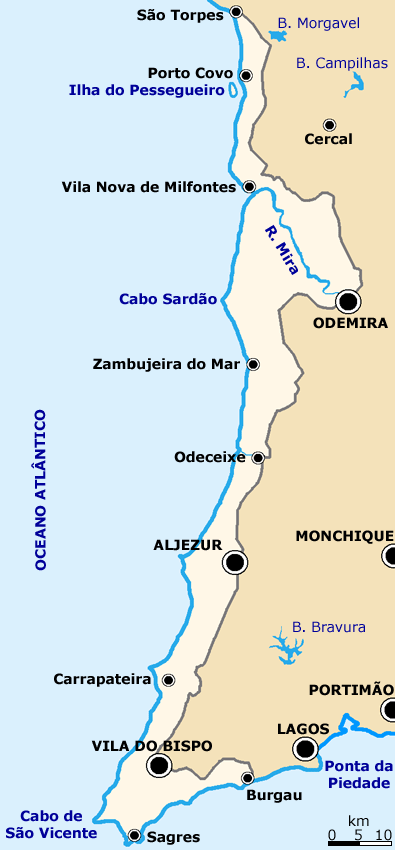
Map of the Vicentine Coast Natural Park
