= Praia das Adegas =

Beach in southern Portugal

Coordinates: 37.4392°N 8.8012°W

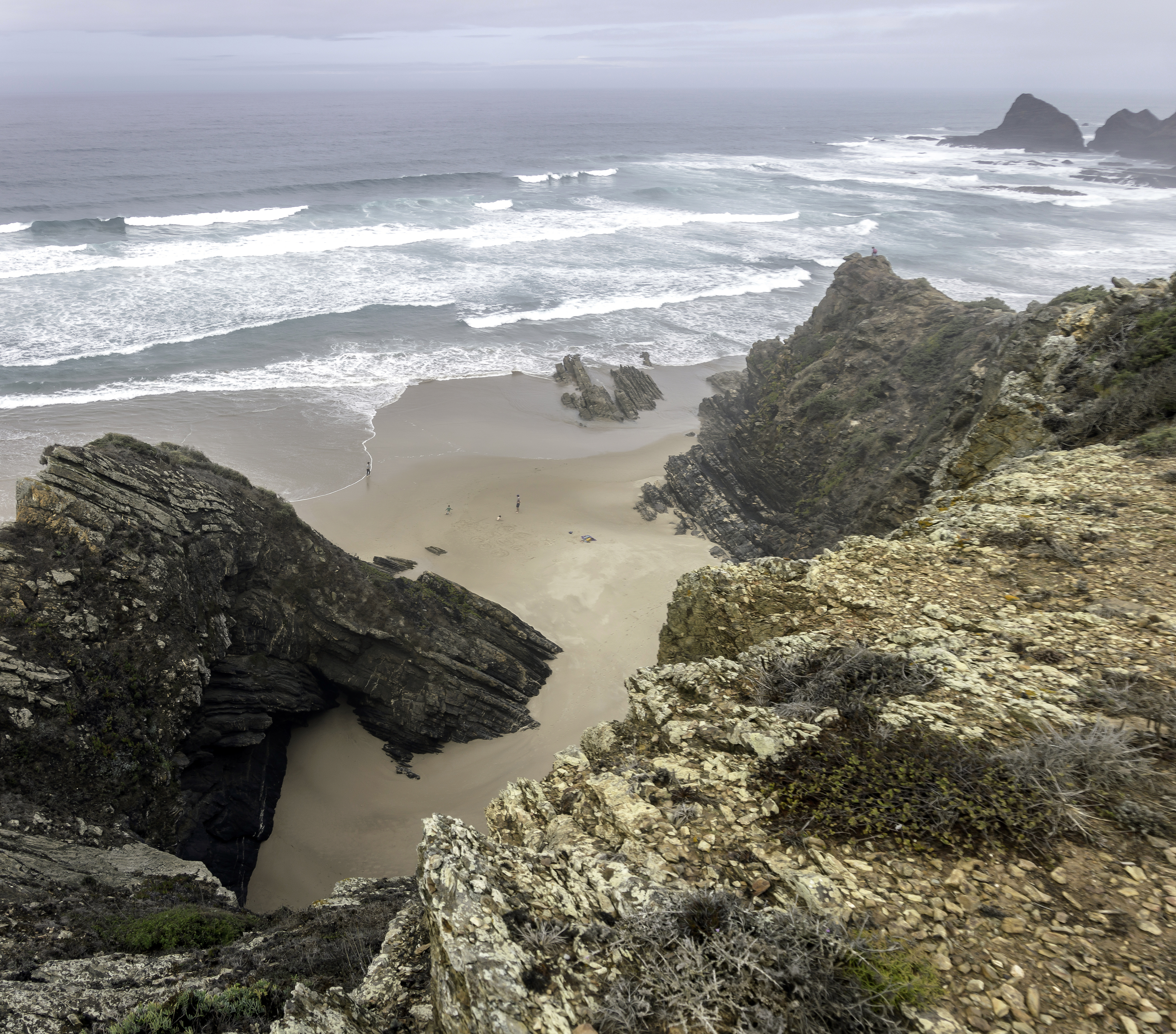

Praia das Adegas is a beach situated in Odeceixe, municipality of Aljezur, in the Atlantic west coast of Algarve, southern Portugal. It is one of the six official naturist beaches in the country.
