= Fort of Arrifana =

17th century fort in Portugal

- Fortaleza da Arrifana
- Faro District; Near Aljezur in Portugal
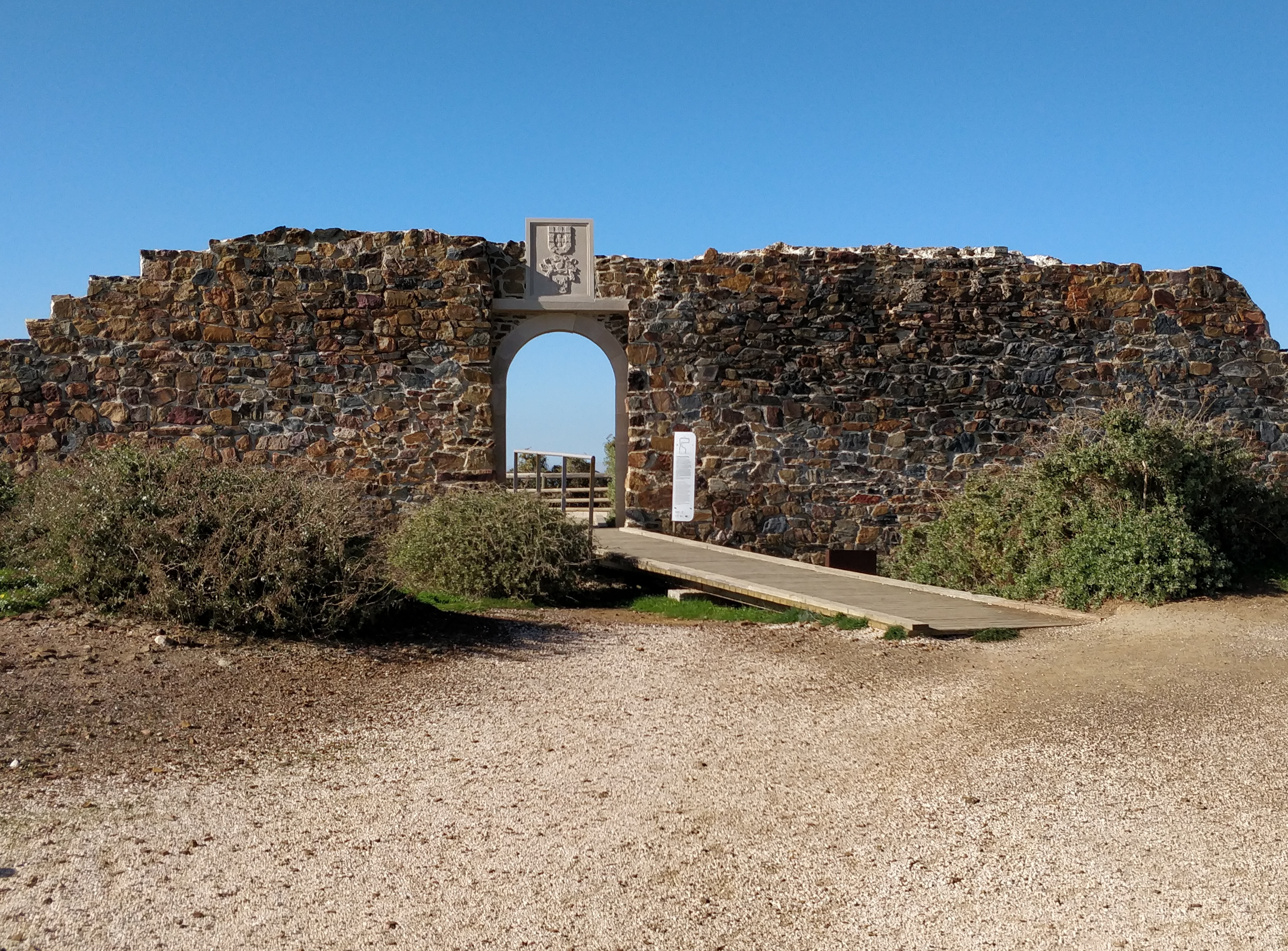
- Reconstructed entrance to the Arrifana fort

Site information
- Type: Fort
- Open to the public: Yes

Location
- Coordinates: 37°17′47″N 8°52′27″W

Site history
- Built: 1635
- Materials: Stone and mortar
- Fate: Front entrance and wall restored in 2007

The Fort of Arrifana, or Fortress of Arrifana, (Portuguese: Fortaleza da Arrifana)) is situated on the Vicentine Coast of the Algarve region of Portugal, on a promontory close to the town of Aljezur. It was originally constructed in 1635 with the intention of protecting fishing grounds for tuna as well as defending the coast. Its location provides a natural lookout over Arrifana Beach and the Vicentine Coast.

== History ==
The fort consisted of two parts linked by a narrow corridor of rock. The front part, immediately behind the entrance, consisted of a guardhouse and lodgings. The battery, with two artillery pieces, faced the sea. On the entrance door was placed a stone that included the date of construction of the fortress, as well as the national coat of arms and the coat of arms of D. Gonçalo Coutinho, Governor of the Algarve.

By 1654 the fort was reported to be unguarded. It was reconstructed in 1670 but there is little information available about its fortunes until it was destroyed by the 1755 earthquake and accompanying tsunami. According to a report of the parish priest of Aljezur, "the sea reached 30 fathoms (55 metres) and returned three times, crashing against the walls of the fortress with such impetus…., [leaving] standing only the battery and the walled curtain of the entrance door".

Due to its strategic position the fort was rebuilt in 1762 by orders of the Governor of the Kingdom of the Algarve, the Marquis of Louriçal. At the time it had two cannons and was garrisoned with 7 soldiers. In the winter of 1765 was again damaged by heavy seas. Repairs were carried out in 1771. By 1792 it was occupied by a corporal and six soldiers, but its condition was bad.

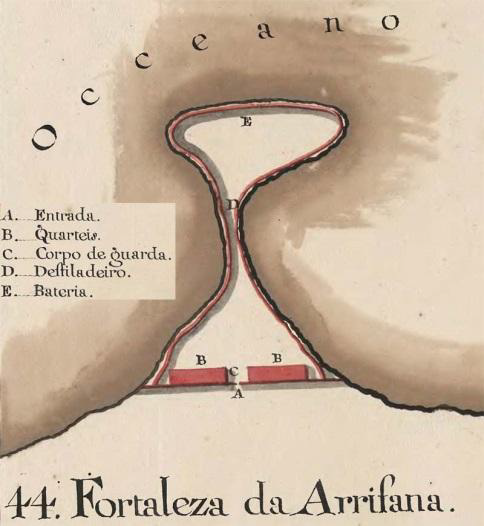
Plan of the Fort of Arrifana made in 1754 showing the narrow connection between the entrance (A) and the battery (E)

During the Portuguese Civil War (1828–1834) the fort was rebuilt and rearmed. By October 1831 it was equipped with 204 12-caliber bullets, 40 fuses, 40 charged cartridges and around 90 kg of gunpowder. The fort was subsequently abandoned for around a century before being turned over to the Ministry of Finance in 1940. Attempts by that ministry to get the Portuguese Navy to take responsibility for it failed, the navy arguing that "...the dismantled ruins of an old stronghold [are] without the slightest interest, either historical or artistic, [with] nothing justifying their conservation in the possession of the State.”

From 2007 the front wall and entrance were reconstructed by the Municipality of Aljezur at a cost of around €100,000. The work also included a parking area, a new fence and walkways and provision of drainage. A small archaeological study was carried out in 2011, identifying that the original construction involved walls of stone and mortar built directly on top of the rock.
