= Praia de Vale Figueiras =

Beach in Aljezur, Portugal

Praia de Vale Figueira
- Beach
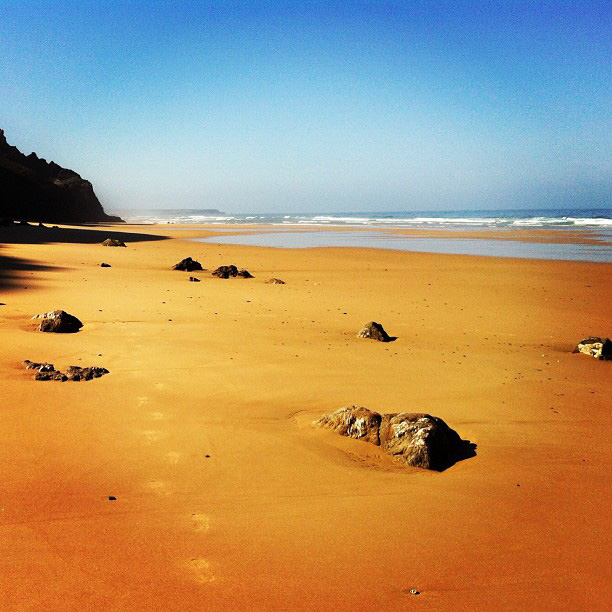
- Praia de Vale Figueira

- Location of Praia de Vale Figueira in Portugal
- Coordinates: 37°16′13″N 8°51′35″W
- Location: Aljezur, Algarve, Portugal

Praia de Vale Figueira is a beach within the Municipality of Aljezur, in the Algarve, Portugal. The beach is on the western Seaboard in the north west of the Algarve. The beach is 9.1 miles (14.6 km) south west of the village of Aljezur, and is 66.6 miles (107.2 km) north west, by road, from the regions capital of Faro. The beach of Praia de Vale Figueira is inside the Vicentine Coast Natural Park, an area of outstanding natural beauty.

== Description ==
This beach consists of an extensive expanse of golden sand. The beach is very popular with surfers, although for the visitor who wants to get away from the crowds this is the perfect place. There are no buildings anywhere around this beach with only a small un-paved road leading up to the back of the beach with plenty of room to park. From the beach there are walks in either direction along the cliff tops for those who would like to enjoy this area of outstanding natural beauty. The area is also a habitat for Osprey who nest in the area, and is one of the most threatened bird species in Portugal. The area is also one of the few places on the Iberian peninsula where it is possible to see an Iberian lynx. Swimmers should be aware of that there is a strong undertow and current just of the beach. There are no lifeguards on this beach.

== Getting there ==
From the village of Aljezur take the EN120 south. After 3.7 miles (6.0 km) there is a fork in the road, take the right signposted EN 268 to Sagres, Vila do Bispo and Alfambras. After a distance of 3.5 kilometres (2.2 mi) at Chabouco turn right, signposted to Vale de Figueira and head west on a small tarmac lane. Stay on this lane, eventually it becomes an un-metalled road. After 5.0 kilometres (3.1 mi) you get to the valley at the back of the beach. There is a small parking area.

== Gallery ==
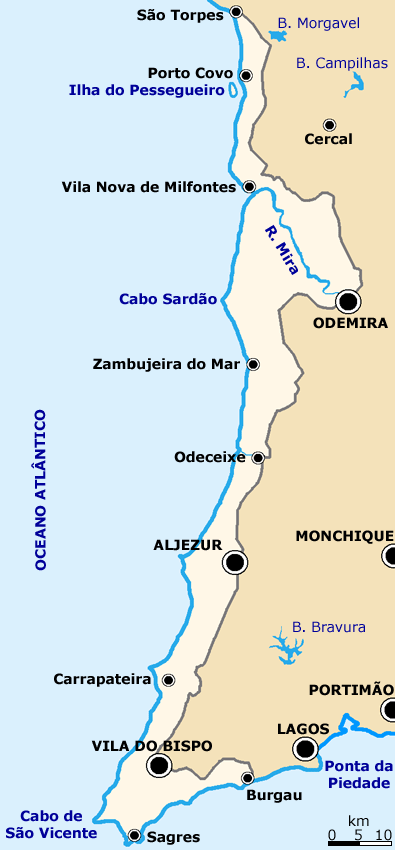
Map of the Vicentine Coast Natural Park
