= Odeceixe =

- Civil parish
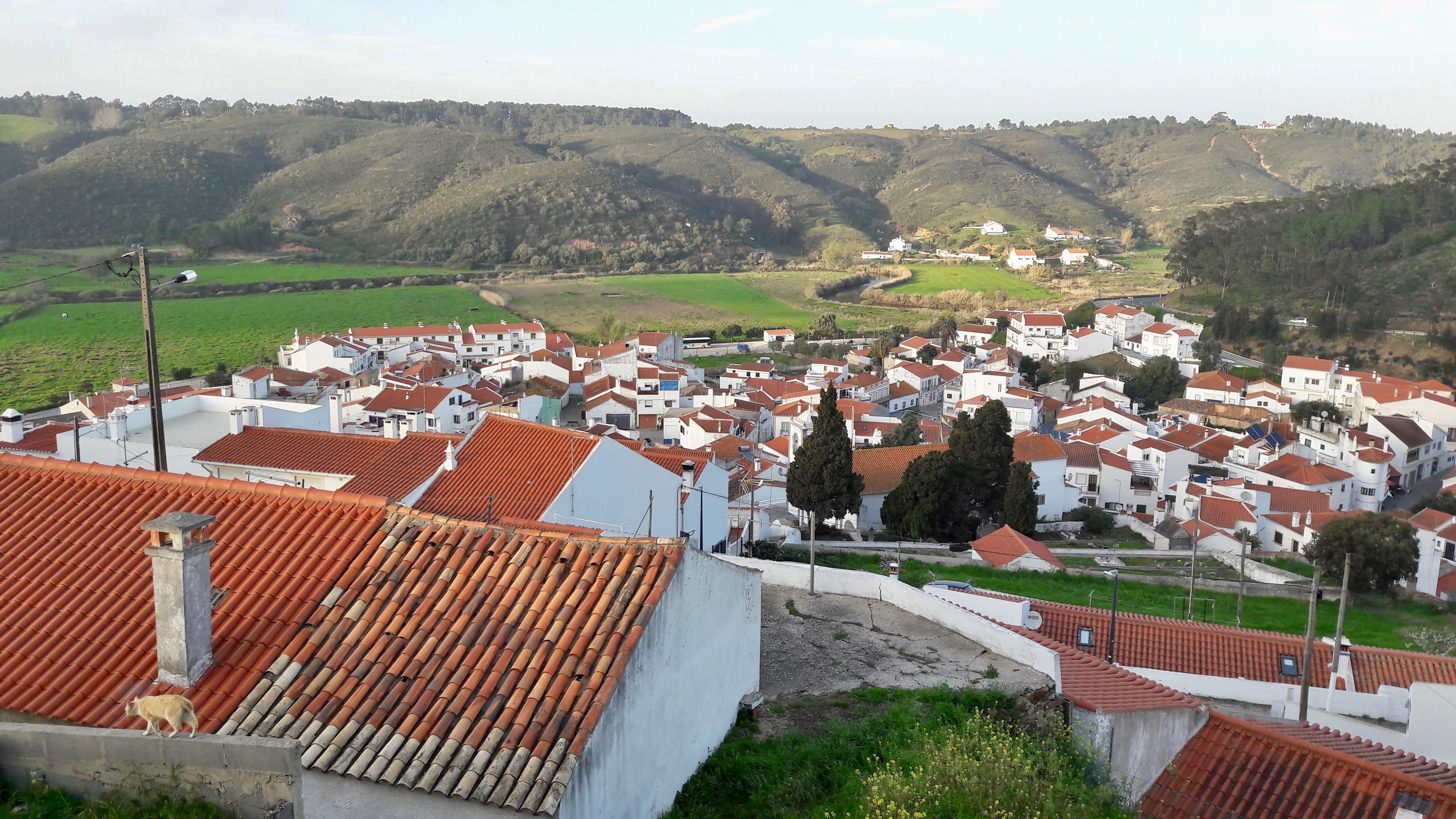
- A general view of Odeceixe

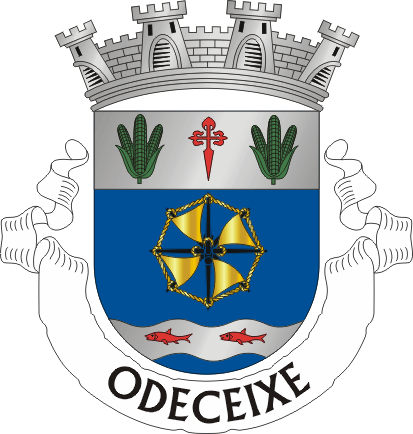
- Coat of arms

- Location in Portugal
- Coordinates: 37.433°N 8.772°W
- Country: Portugal
- Region: Algarve
- Intermunic. comm.: Algarve
- District: Faro
- Municipality: Aljezur

Area
  - Total: 41.91 km^{2} (16.18 sq mi)

Population (2011)
  - Total: 961
  - Density: 22.9/km^{2} (59.4/sq mi)
- Time zone: UTC+00:00 (WET)
  - Summer (DST): UTC+01:00 (WEST)
- Postal code: 8670
- Patron: Nossa Senhora da Piedade
- Website: http://www.jf-odeceixe.pt

Odeceixe (European Portuguese pronunciation: [ɔðɨˈsɐjʃɨ]) is a village and civil parish in the northern part of the municipality of Aljezur, in the Portuguese Algarve, lying within the Nature Park of the Southwest Alentejo and Vincentine Coast. The village lies on the south bank of the Ribeira de Seixe, which here forms the border between the Algarve and Alentejo. The population of the parish in 2011 was 961, in an area of 41.91 km^{2}.

== Geography ==
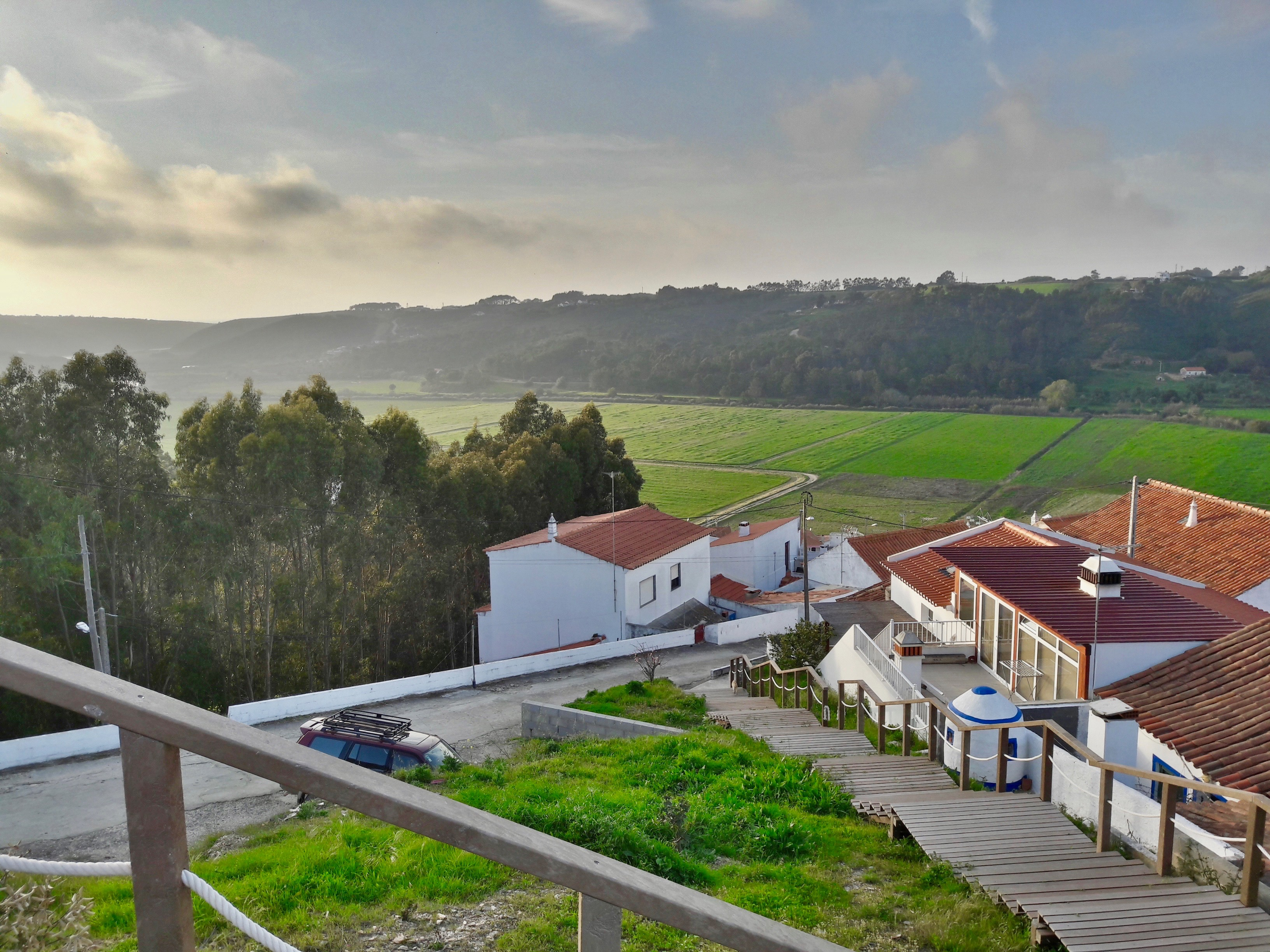
Odeceixe's countryside

The parish of Odeceixe is situated on the steeply inclined topography that divides the Algarve and Alentejo regions; the south bank of the Ribeira de Seixe which runs through this parish is the dividing line for this frontier.

The parish includes Praia do Odeceixe, 4 km west of the village of Odeceixe, at the mouth of the Ribeira de Seixe. This has one of the few official naturist beaches in Portugal.

The parish is bordered in the north by São Teotónio, east by Marmelete and south by Rogil, while to the west is the Atlantic Ocean.
