= Aljezur =

- Municipality
- Town of Aljezur
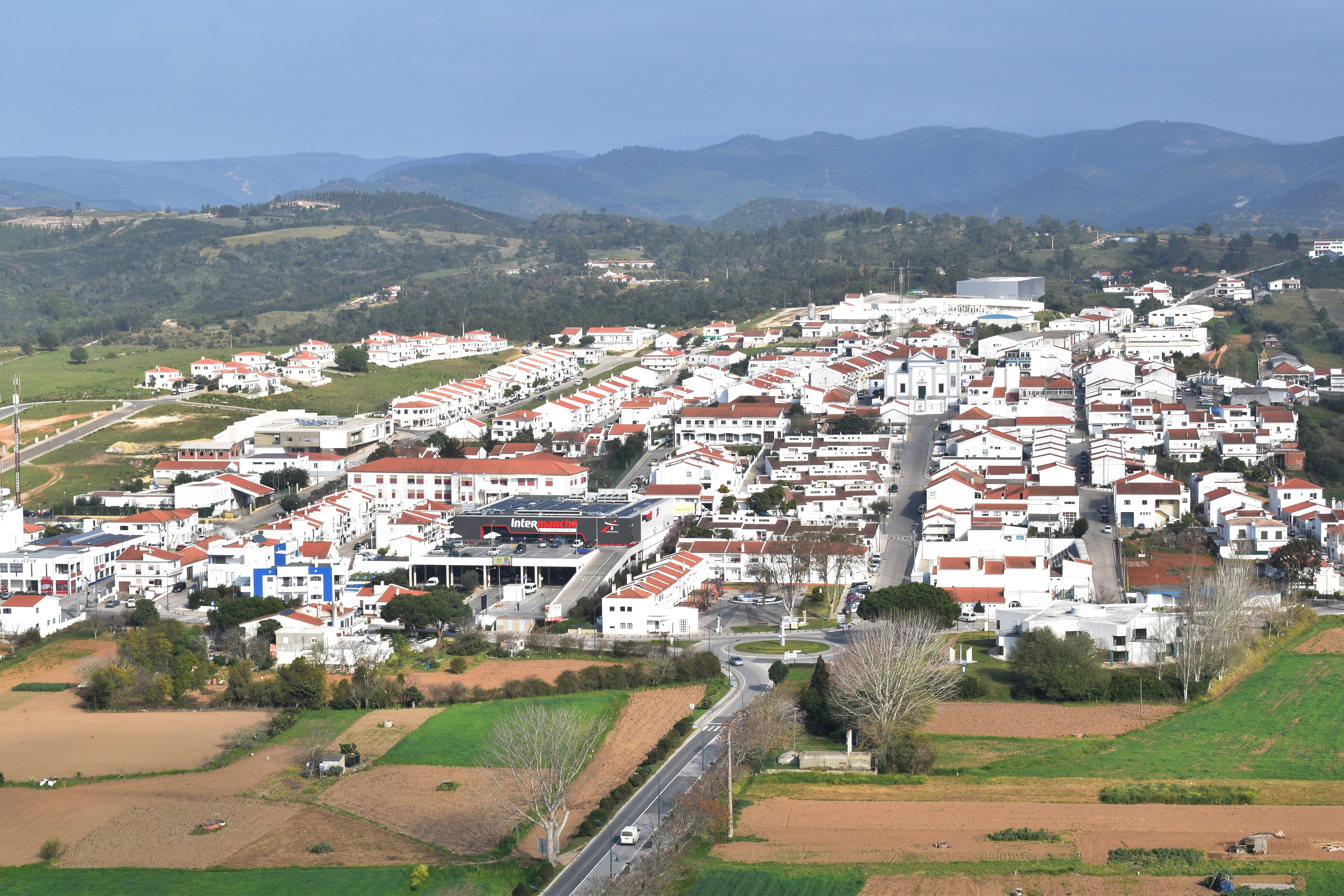
- The nucleus of the civil parish of Aljezur, historical center and seat of the municipality

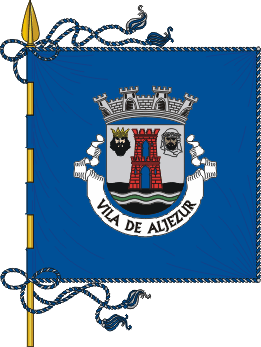
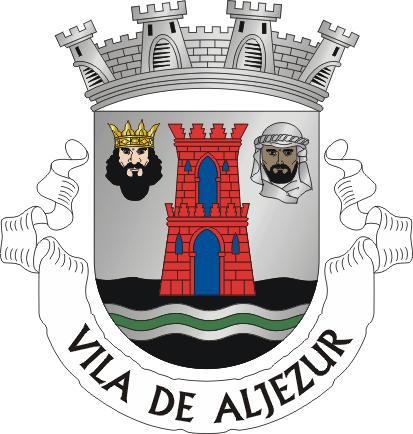
- Flag Coat of arms
- Interactive map of Aljezur
- Location in Portugal
- Coordinates: 37°19′N 8°48′W
- Country: Portugal
- Region: Algarve
- Intermunic. comm.: Algarve
- District: Faro
- Parishes: 4

Government
  - President: José Manuel Lucas Gonçalves (PS)

Area
  - Total: 323.50 km^{2} (124.90 sq mi)

Population (2011)
  - Total: 5,884
  - Density: 18.19/km^{2} (47.11/sq mi)
- Time zone: UTC+00:00 (WET)
  - Summer (DST): UTC+01:00 (WEST)
- Website: http://www.cm-aljezur.pt

Aljezur (Portuguese pronunciation: [alʒɨˈzuɾ]), officially the Town of Aljezur (Portuguese: Vila de Aljezur), is a town and municipality of the District of Faro and Algarve region, in Portugal. The population in 2011 was 5,884, in an area of 323.50 km^{2}. The municipality comprises 4 parishes.

== History ==
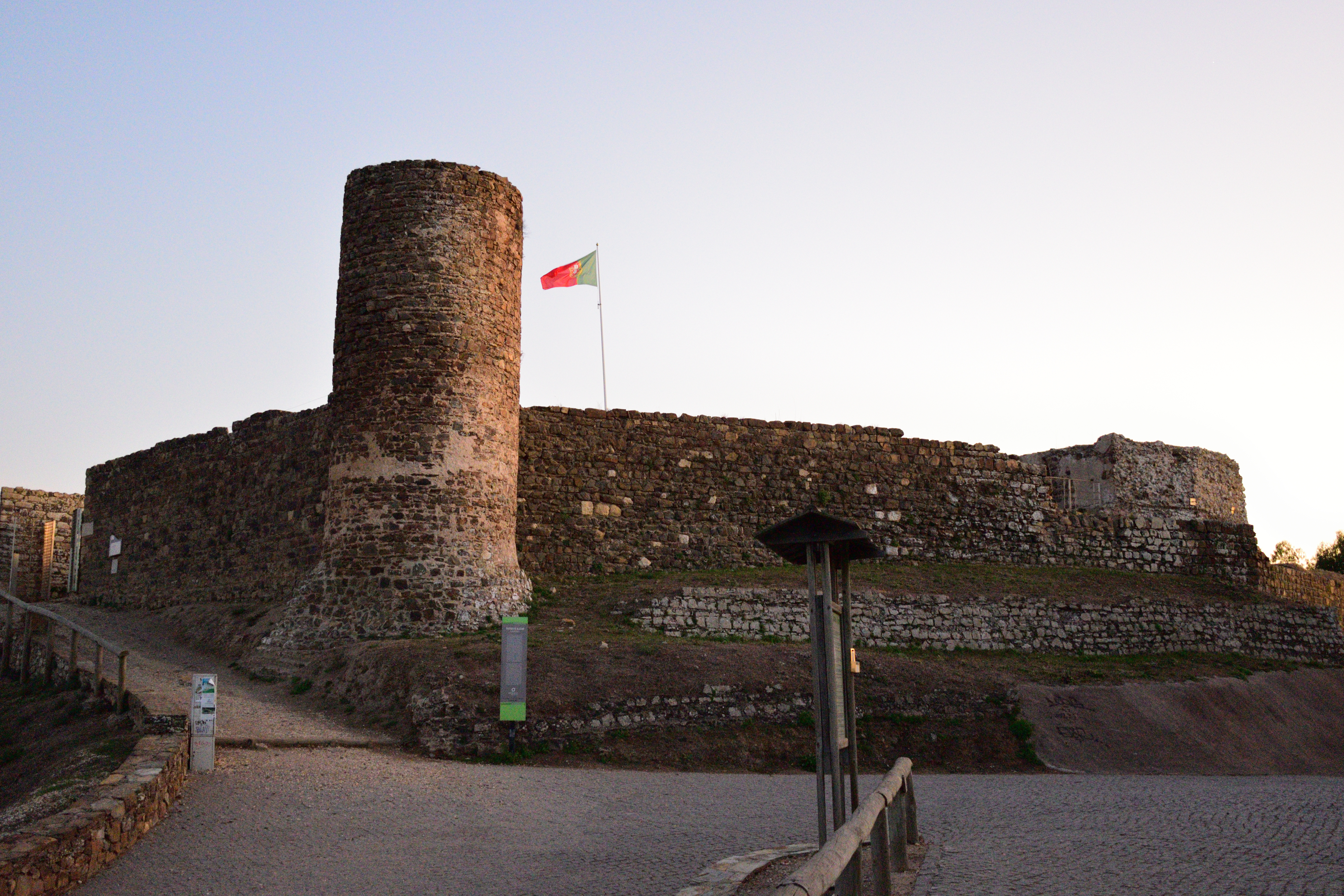
Aljezur's Castle

Aljezur is a land that has distant origins, and is marked by various archeological remnants. Its territory has been inhabited since prehistory. Vestiges from remote pre-history generally attest to the age of the region (as early as 7000 BCE). Nomadic tribes of hunter-gathers, hunted or fished in the region, in addition to scavenging in the lands for tubers or roots, that constituted their basic diet. It was during the Neolithic and Calcolithic (3000-2500 BCE) and Bronze Age (1200-800 NCE) that settlement began to take root. But, the period of Muslim occupation (during the 10th-11th century) resulted in the largest expansion of architectonic construction, as evidenced by archaeological excavations in the Castle of Aljezur, Ponta da Atalaia (Ribat of Arrifana), and Ponta do Castelo (Carrapateira), as well as in Alcaria. A 12th Century fishing village excavated in 2001 gives evidence of an agro-maritime economy with fishing, crop cultivation and animal rearing being carried out.

Politically, Aljezur was founded in the 10th century by Berbers who remained in the region for the following five centuries, until the Christian conquest. They were responsible for many of the structures in the region, such as the main castle, but also for the many names that dotted the region's toponymy, as well as the legends and myths that developed by its peoples.

The village of Aljezur was taken from the Moors in 1249, during the reign of D. Afonso III, by Paio Peres Correia, Master of the Order of Santiago. The Christians gave thanks for their success to the Virgin Mary, and in an expansion of faith, Nossa Senhora da Alva (Our Lady of the Dawn) was named patron saint of Aljezur, as a result of the mythical legend of the Conquest of the Castle.

Aljezur obtained a foral (charter) from 12 November 1280, issued by King Denis of Portugal in Estremoz, it was the first charter issued by the king in the Algarve. On 1 June 1504, King Manuel of Portugal reformed the diplomatic map issued by King Denis, and promoted the town with the title Nobre e Honrada (Noble and Honoured).

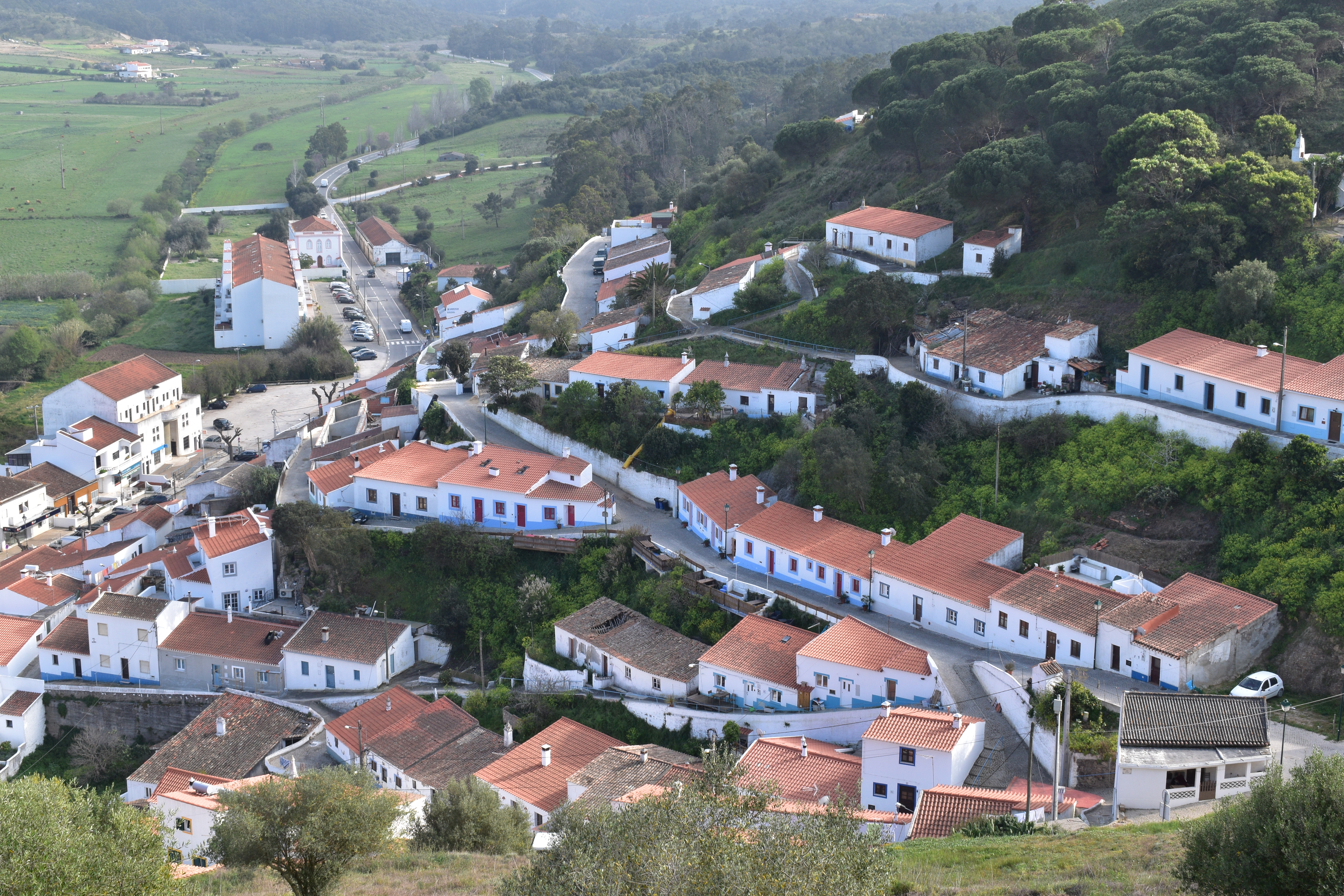
Entrance of Aljezur as seen from the Castle

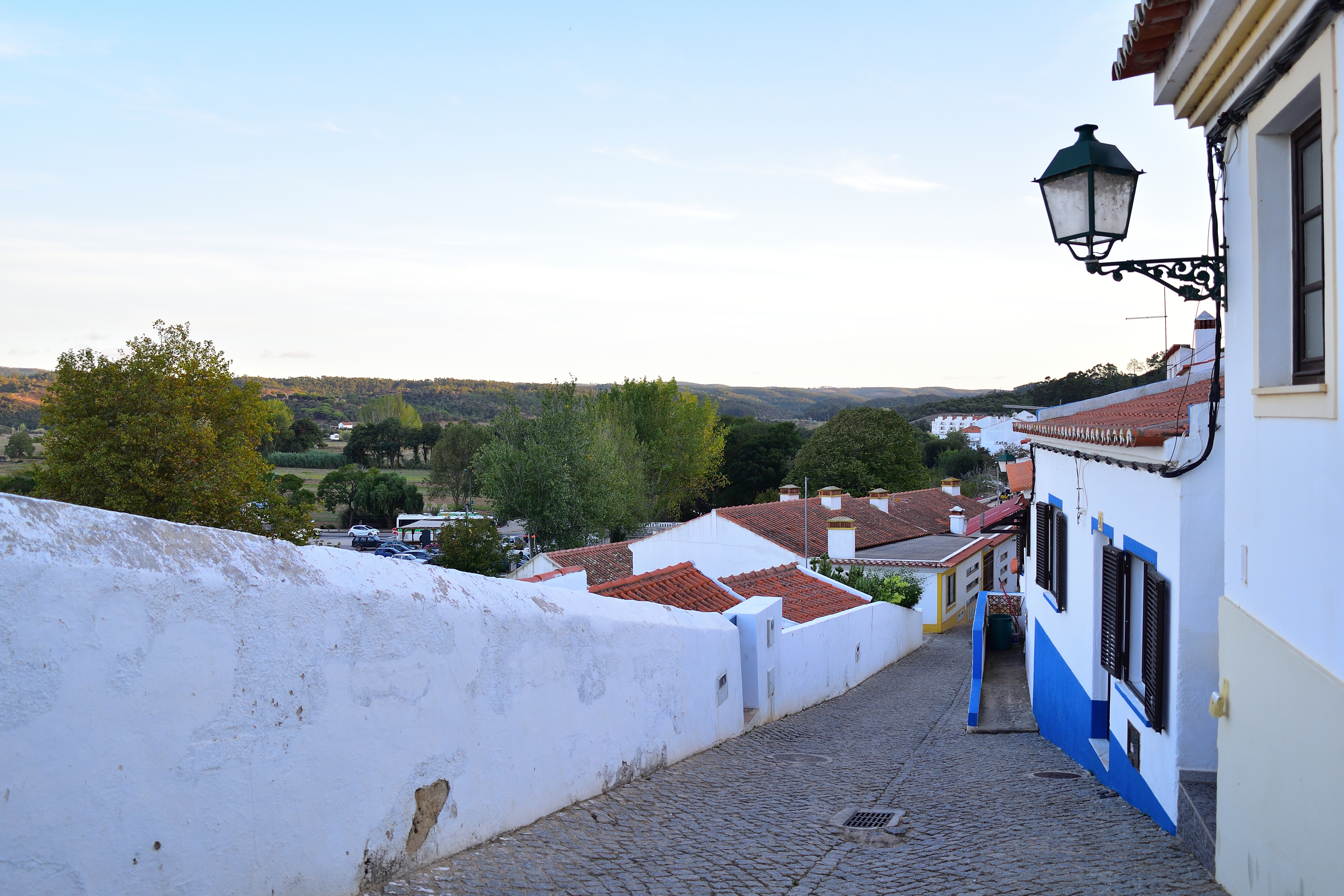
View of a street in Aljezur

Following the Restoration War, in the reigns of King Afonso VI and his brother, regent (then King) Peter II, the coastal lands were occupied by Moroccan corsairs that anchored in the coastal coves and unprotected anchorages, then attacked and pillaged the local towns. Carrapateira was erected between two beaches, where pirates could easily disembark: Praia da Bordeira (to the north) and Praia do Amado (to the south). Similarly, in Arrifana, which formed a small cove protected by strong waves and easy access to the sea. Therefore, in the 17th century, they national government constructed the Fort of Arrifana; erected in 1635, rebuilt in 1635 and 1670, it was originally established to protect a fishing port that existed by 1516.

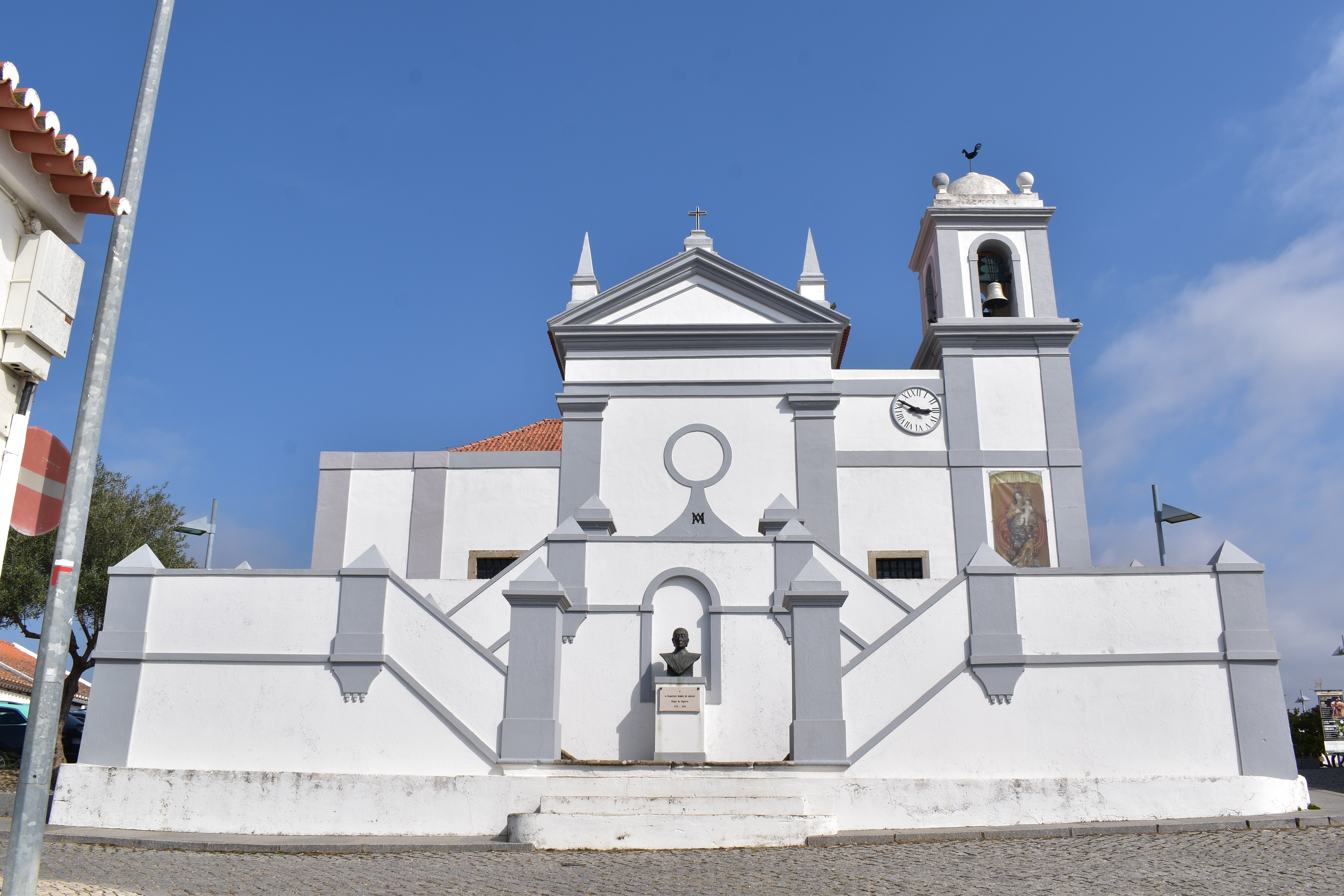
Matrix church of Nossa Senhora da Alva, built at the end of the 18th century, after 1755 earthquake

The Church of Carrapateira, dedicated to Our Lady of the Conception, was constructed during the reign of John IV, sometime around 1673. The place where the church was erected (a hilltop with a view to the sea and settlement) was the ideal place for a church, but also for the construction of the Fort of Carrapateira, by D. Nuno da Cunha de Ataíde, Count of Pontevel and governor. It was there that the temple was erected.

All of Aljezur was gravely damaged by the 1755 earthquake. Bishop Francisco Gomes de Avelar ordered the construction of the Church of Nossa Senhora de Alva in the edge of the town, in order to form a new population center. Its name slowly adapted the name Igreja Nova (New Church).

== Beaches ==
=== Praia da Arrifana ===
- Description: Praia da Arrifana is a Blue Flag beach nestled in a sheltered bay and flanked by towering dark cliffs. At the northern headland lie the ruins of the 12th-century Castle of Arrifana.
- Activities: It is one of the most popular and consistent surfing and bodyboarding spots in Portugal, offering protection from strong Atlantic winds.

=== Praia de Monte Clérigo ===
- Description: Praia de Monte Clérigo features an expansive area of fine golden sand and a small, traditional fishing hamlet built right onto the cliffs. At low tide, a shallow lagoon forms on the beach.
- Marine Life: The extensive rock formations on the southern end provide thriving tidal pools home to starfish, crabs, and juvenile sea bream.

=== Praia da Amoreira ===
- Description: Located at the mouth of the Aljezur River, Praia da Amoreira offers a unique geographic layout where visitors can choose between swimming in the calm river waters or the waves of the Atlantic Ocean.
- Environment: The area features extensive sand dune systems and marshlands that serve as a habitat for kingfishers and otters.

=== Praia de Odeceixe Mar ===
- Description: Situated at the northernmost tip of the municipality, Praia de Odeceixe Mar is formed by the estuary of the Seixe River, which separates the Algarve from the Alentejo region.
- Naturism: Just south of the main beach lies Praia das Adegas, which is one of Portugal's officially designated naturist beaches.

== Geography ==
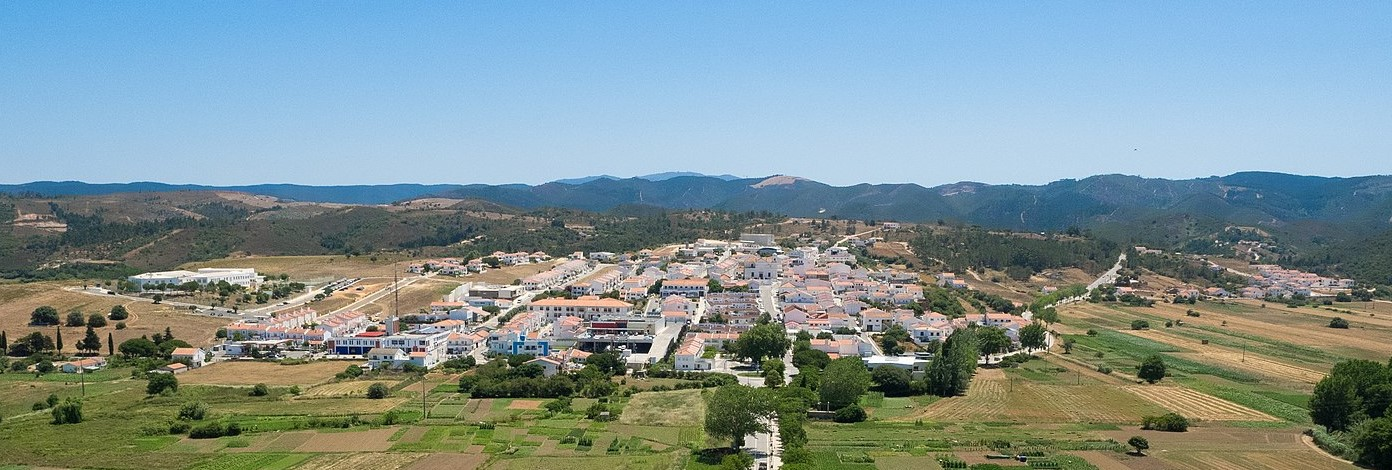
Panorama of the town

Aljezur is located along the western coast of the Algarve, within the Southwest Alentejo and St. Vincent Coast Nature Park: this region, mixes landscapes clifftop landscapes and sea fronts. From the north to south, from Odeceixe to Carrapateira, the municipality is a mixture of many views, marked by archaeological vestiges of elevated interest, museums, windmills, cultural landscapes, histo-cultural circuits and recreational trails and BTT bike trails. The coast is carved by nature, with a coast of 40 kilometres (25 mi) marked by beaches from Odeceixe, until Amado, known for its surfing conditions.

Administratively, the municipality is divided into 4 civil parishes (freguesias):

- Aljezur
- Bordeira
- Odeceixe
- Rogil

== Local services ==
There are regular bus services running south to Lagos and north to Lisbon.

== Education ==
Aljezur is home to both primary and secondary state schools and has an International Secondary School Aljezur International School located in the town parish.
