= Praia do Inatel =

Beach in Albufeira, Algarve, Portugal

- Beach
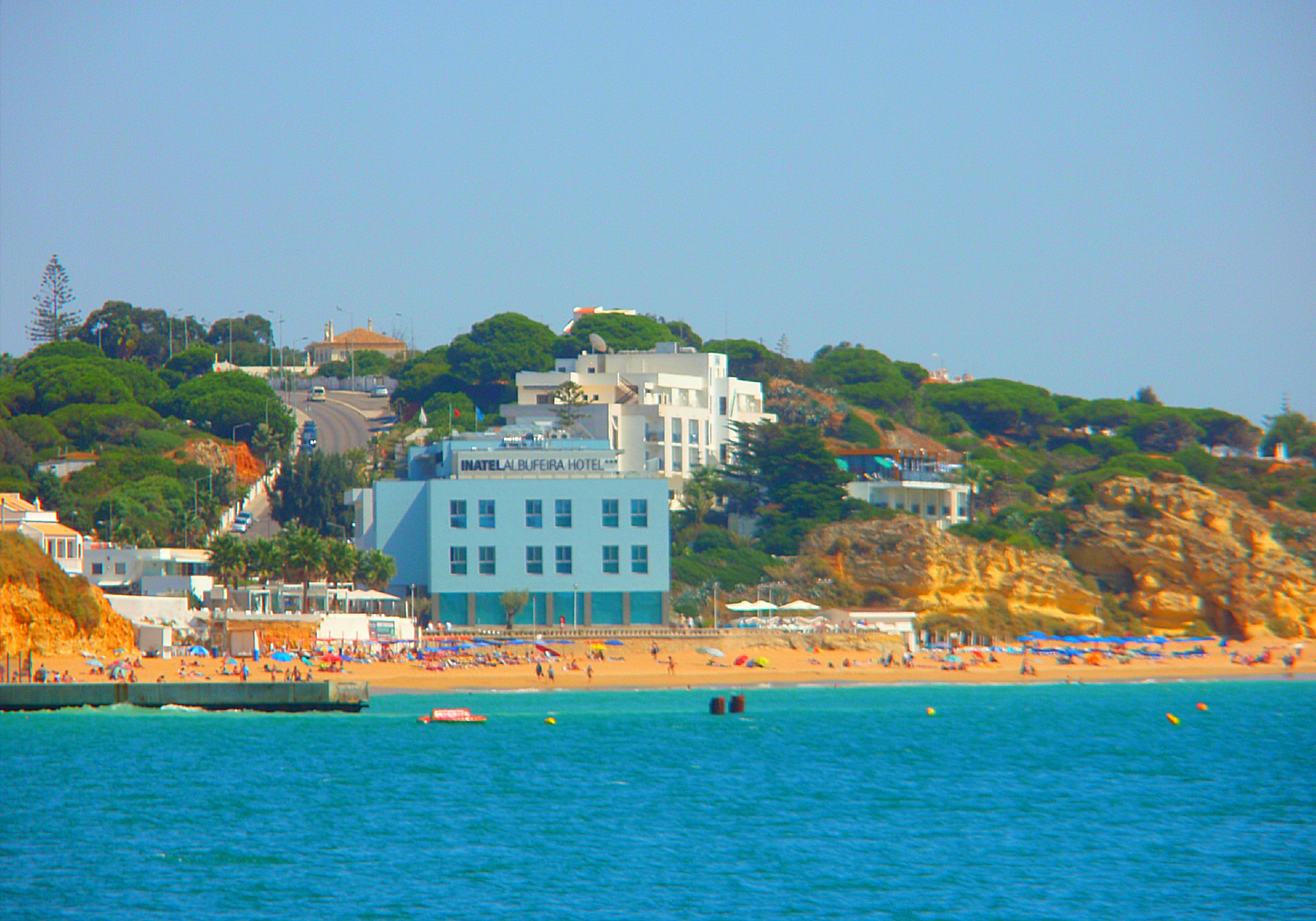
- Praia do Inatel

- Location of Praia do Inatel
- Coordinates: 37°5′07.9″N 8°14′36.7″W
- Location: Albufeira, Algarve, Portugal

Praia do Inatel is a Blue flag beach located in the resort town of Albufeira, Algarve, Portugal. The beach lies to the east of Albufeira old town in the district of Bairro dos Pescadores (Neighborhood of the Fisherman), and is dominated by the Albufeira Inatel Hotel which sit to the rear of the beach and from which the beach takes its name.

== Description ==
The beach is approximately 800 meters in length and is 450 meters wide at low tide. The western boundary of the beach is situated at a concrete pier which covers the outflow of the Ribeira de Albufeira (Albufeira River). At the eastern boundary the beach merges with the neighbouring beach of Praia dos Alemães. The beach is in easy walking distance of the many Hotels and holiday accommodation located in the eastern suburbs of the old town. There is no dedicated parking for the beach although spaces can be found in the Avenida Infante Dom Henrique which runs adjacent to the rear of the beach. There are two licensed bar, restaurant concessions along the beach. there are toilet and shower facilities and there are opportunities to hire parasols and sun loungers. During the summer months the beach is patrolled by lifeguards. There is also a raised board walk running in front of the Inatel hotel and a small section in front of the western beach concession.

== Gallery ==
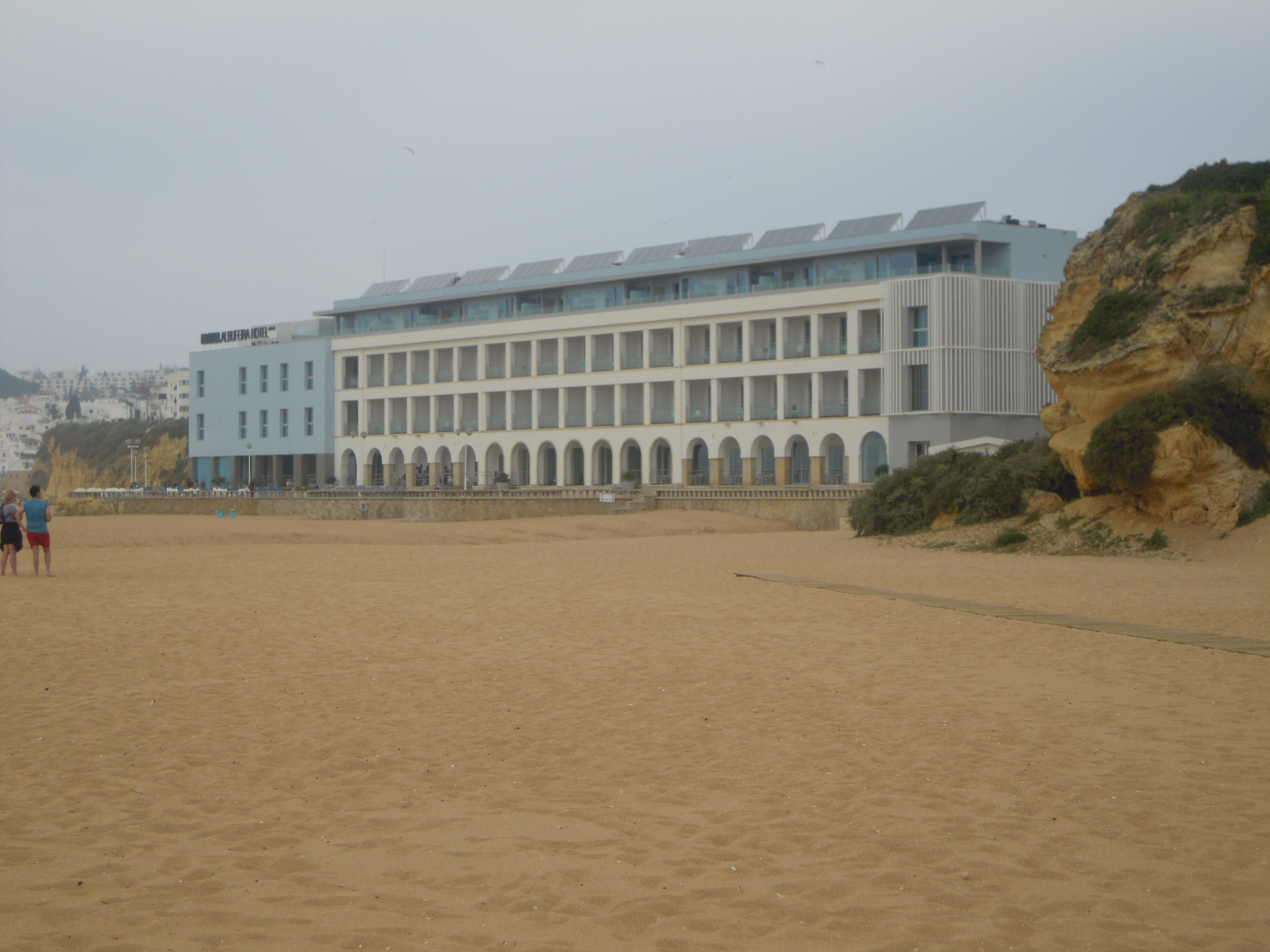
The INATEL Albufeira Hotel which dominates the rear of the beach and from where the beach derives its name

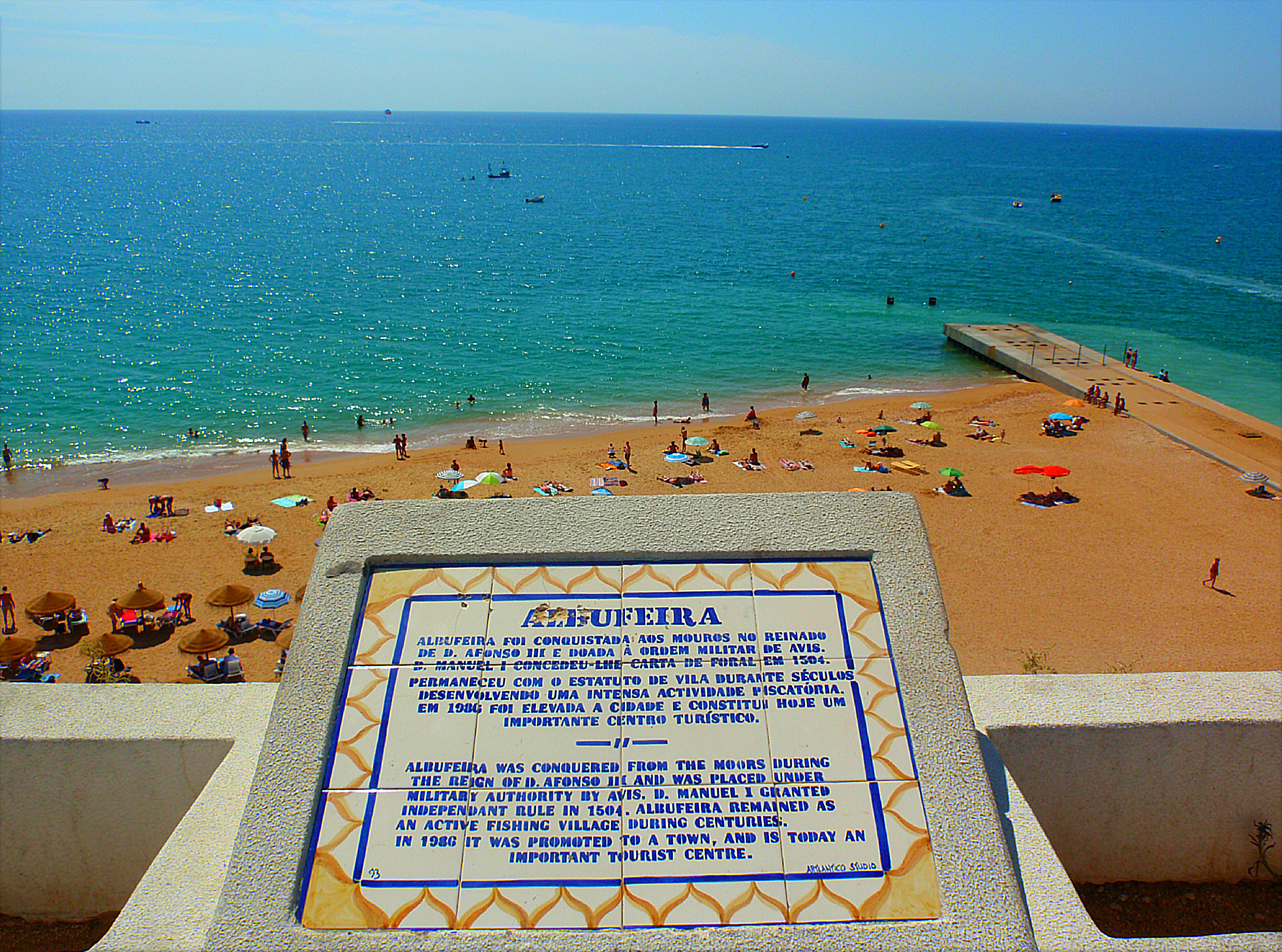
The western end of the beach with the boundary marked by the concrete pier which covers the outflow of the Ribeira de Albufeira.

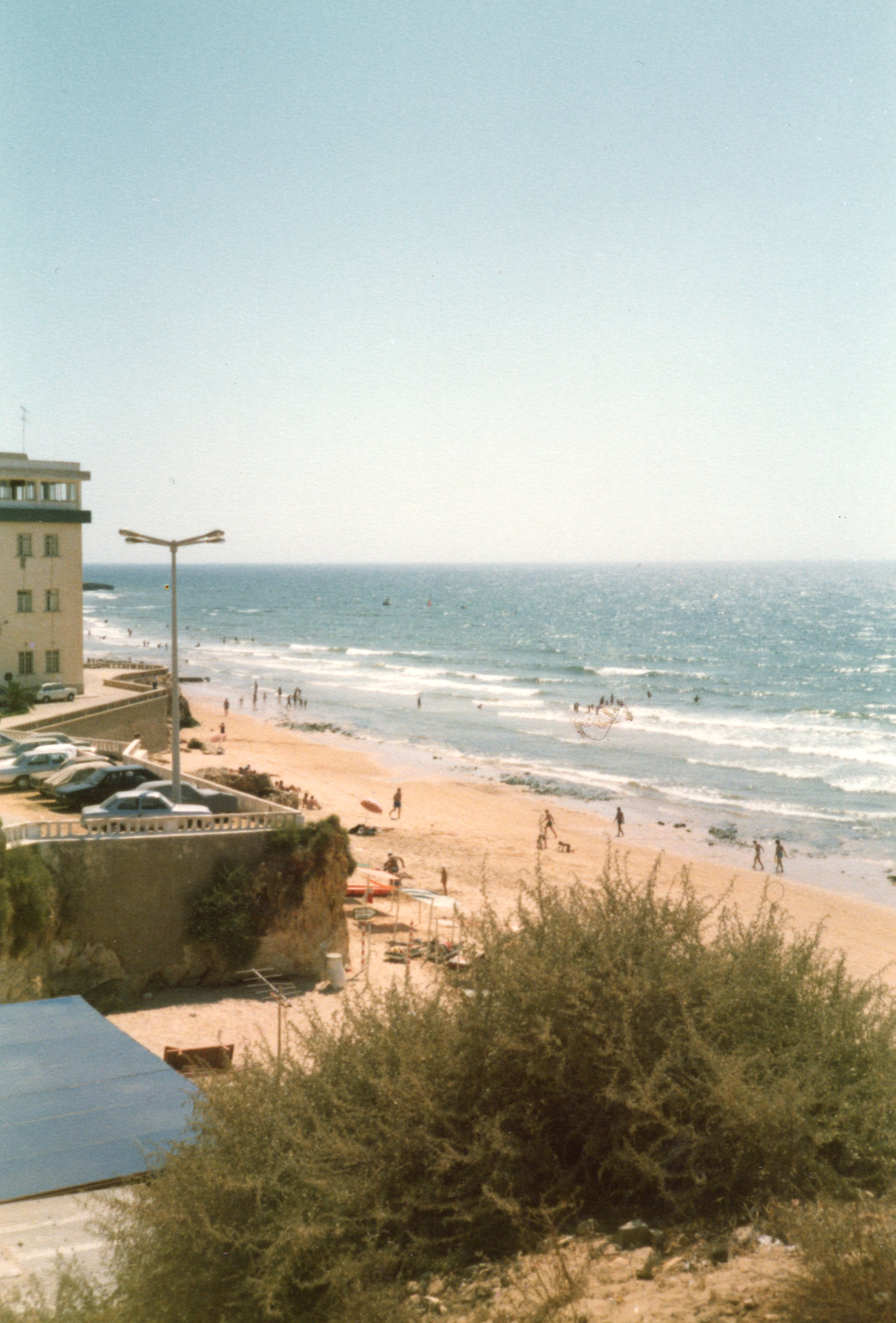
The beach as it was in 1985 before the renovation of the hotel.

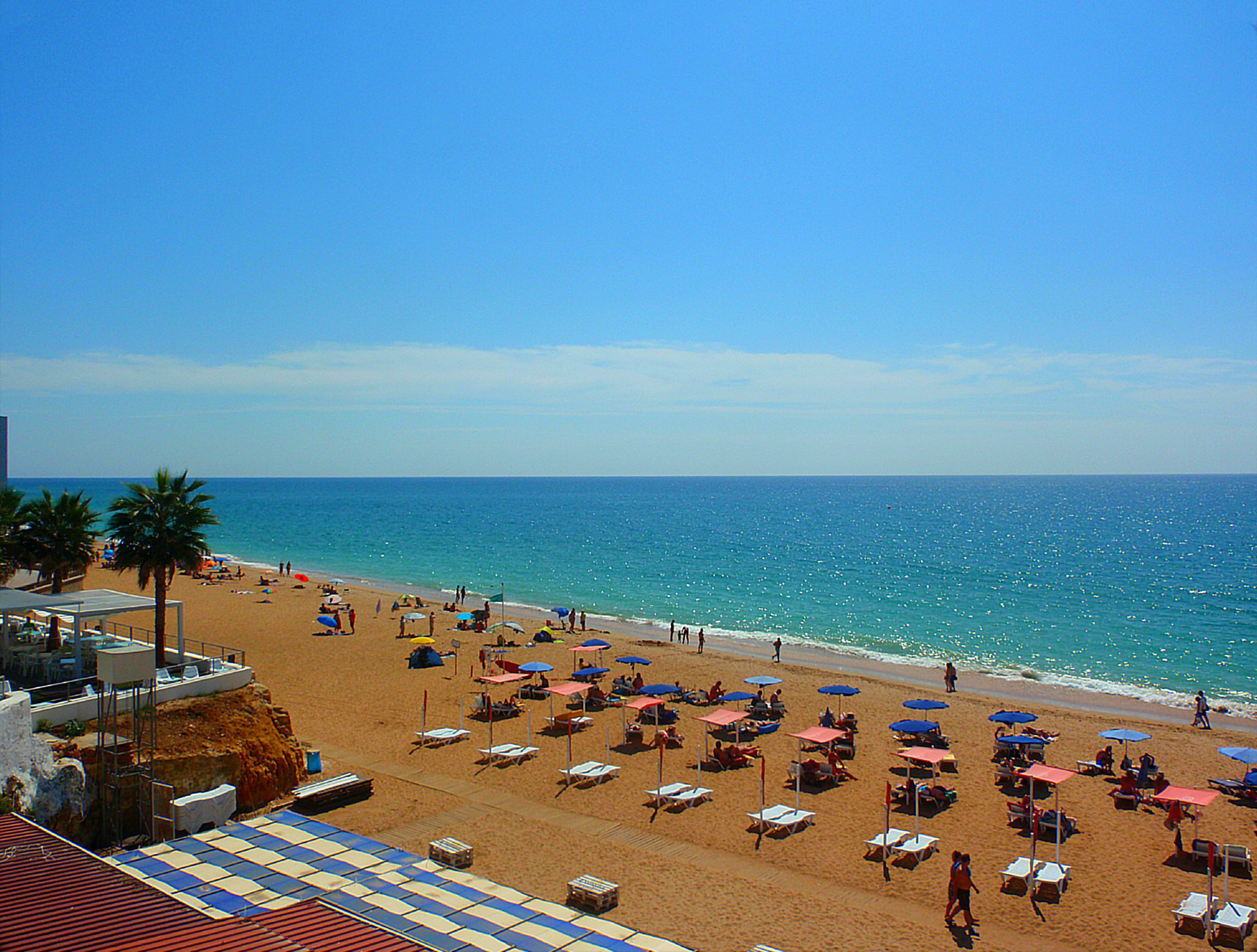
The raised board walk running in front of the western beach concession which includes the hire of parasols and sun loungers.

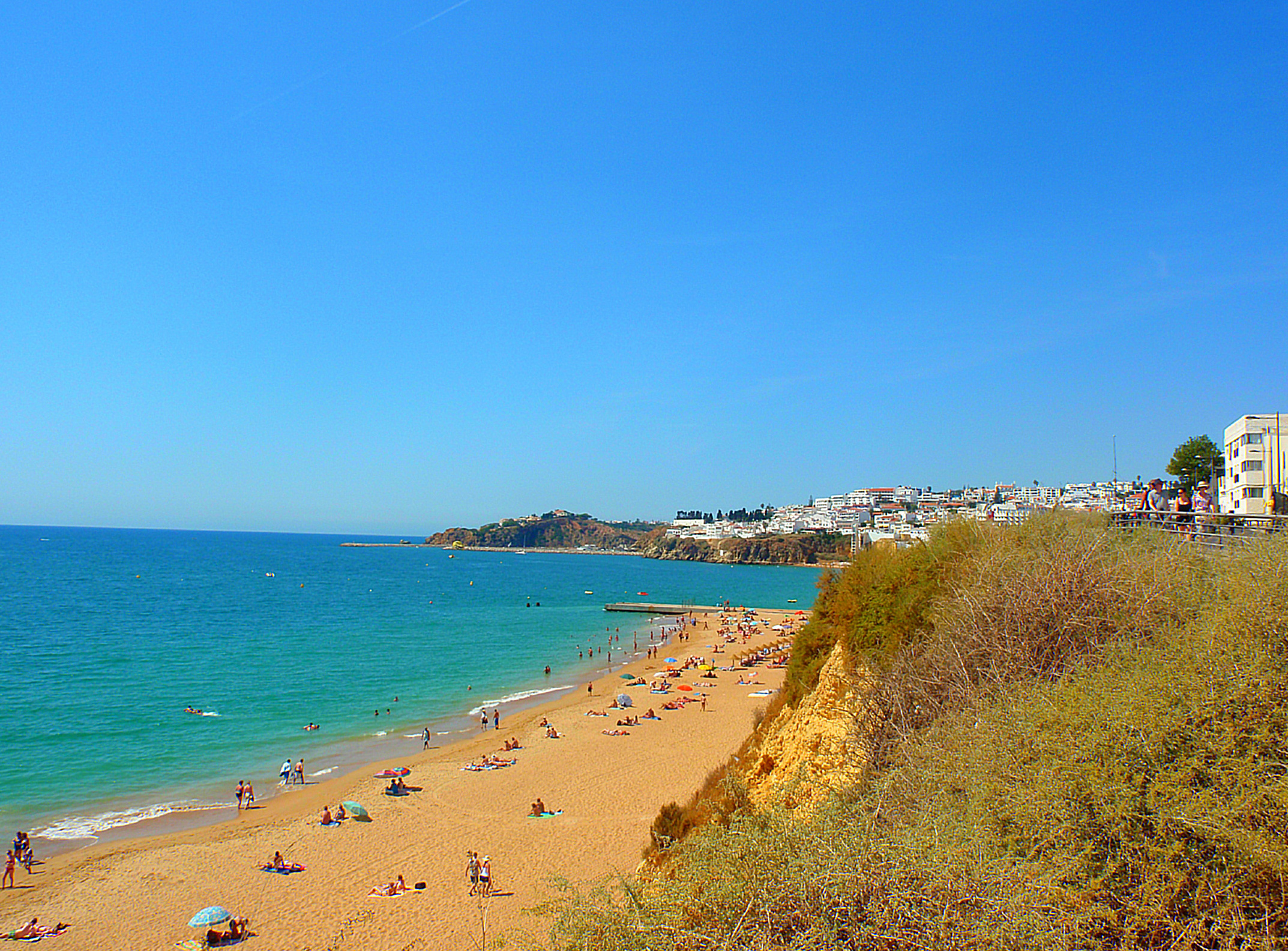
Looking to the west along the beach from the cliff top.
