= Praia dos Alemães =

Beach in Portugal

- Beach
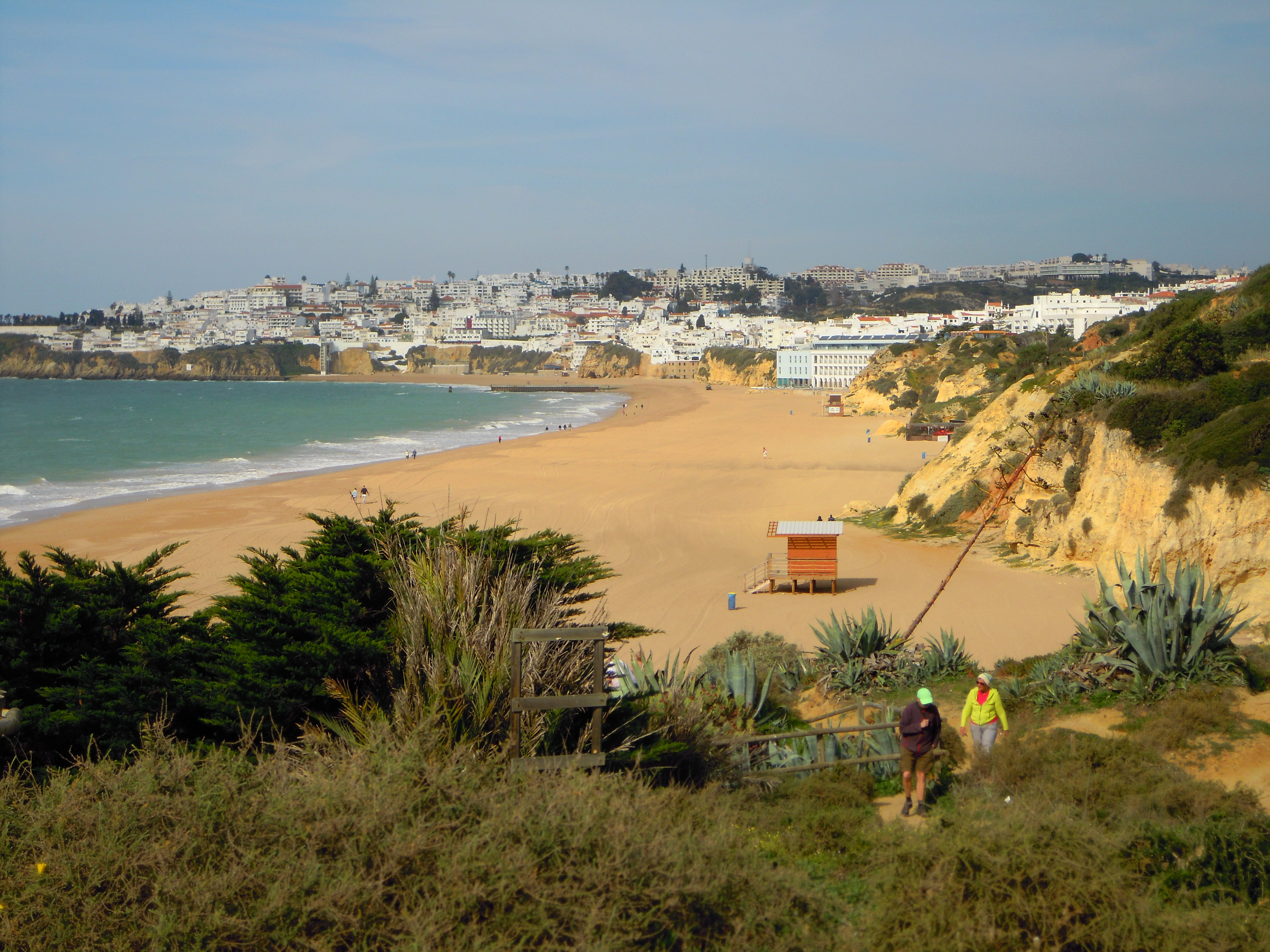
- Praia dos Alemães

- Coordinates: 37°5′02.7″N 8°14′13.8″W
- Location: Albufeira, Portugal

Praia dos Alemães (English: Germans' Beach) is a blue flag beach located west of Albufeira old town and is flanked either side by Praia dos Aveiros to the west and to the east by Praia do Inatel.

== Description ==
This wide beach is about 500 meters in length and has fine gold sand and is backed by sandy golden low cliffs prone to some erosion during wet weather some of which can be hazardous with rock falls. To the rear of the beach there are several large holiday apartment and hotel complexes along with numerous holiday and residential villas. These developments are dissected by small lanes and paths giving access to the beach with the main access lane being Rua Columbano Bordalo Pinheiro in the Forte de São João neighbourhood of Albufeira.

== Facilities ==
There is also a raised board walk running both east and west from the beach access point by the Hotel Monica Isabel Beach Club. There are several licensed bar, restaurant concessions along the beach. there are toilet and shower facilities and there are opportunities to hire parasols and sun loungers. During the summer months the beach is patrolled by lifeguards.

== Gallery ==
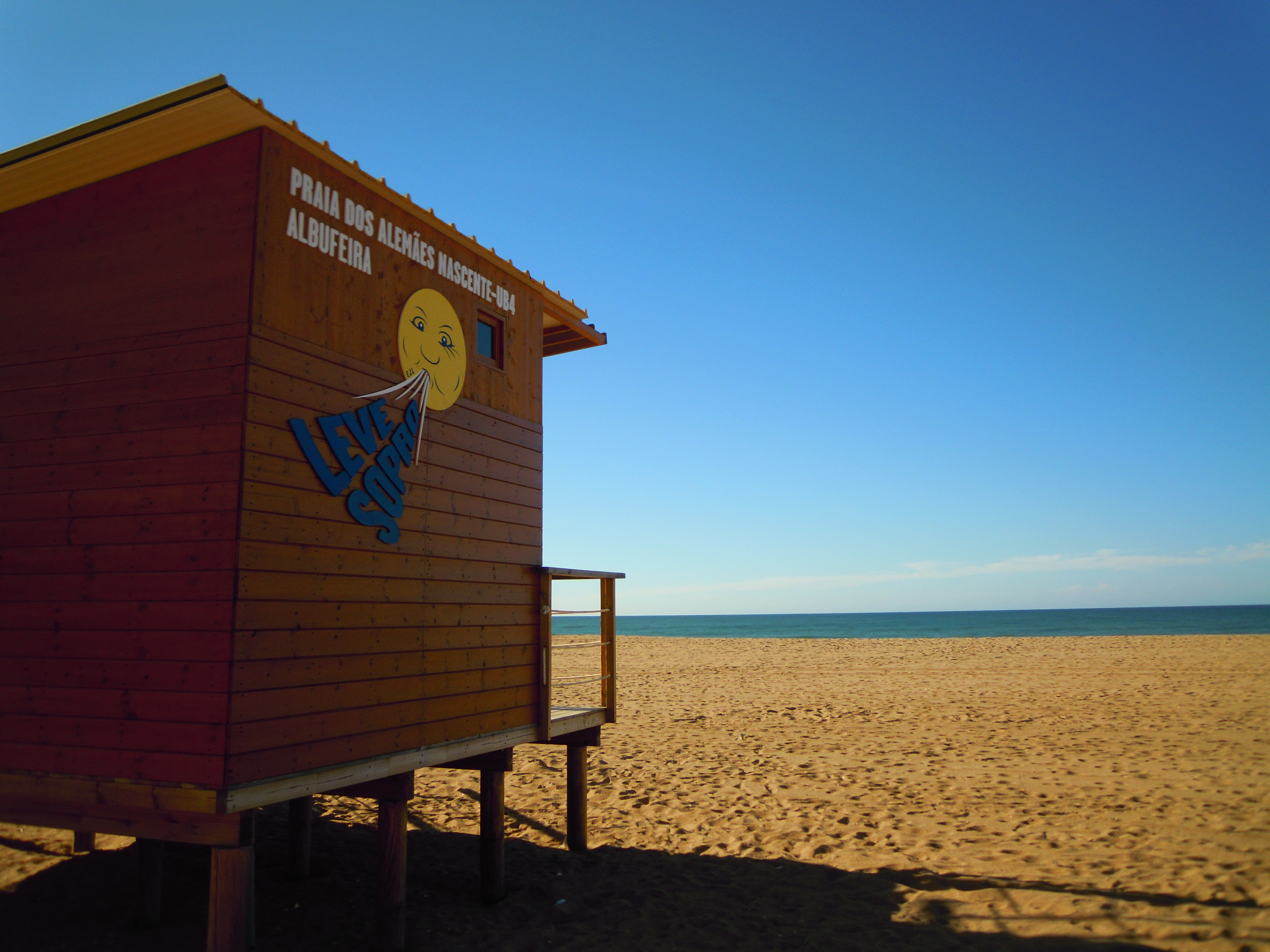
Lifeguard and first aid post on the beach.

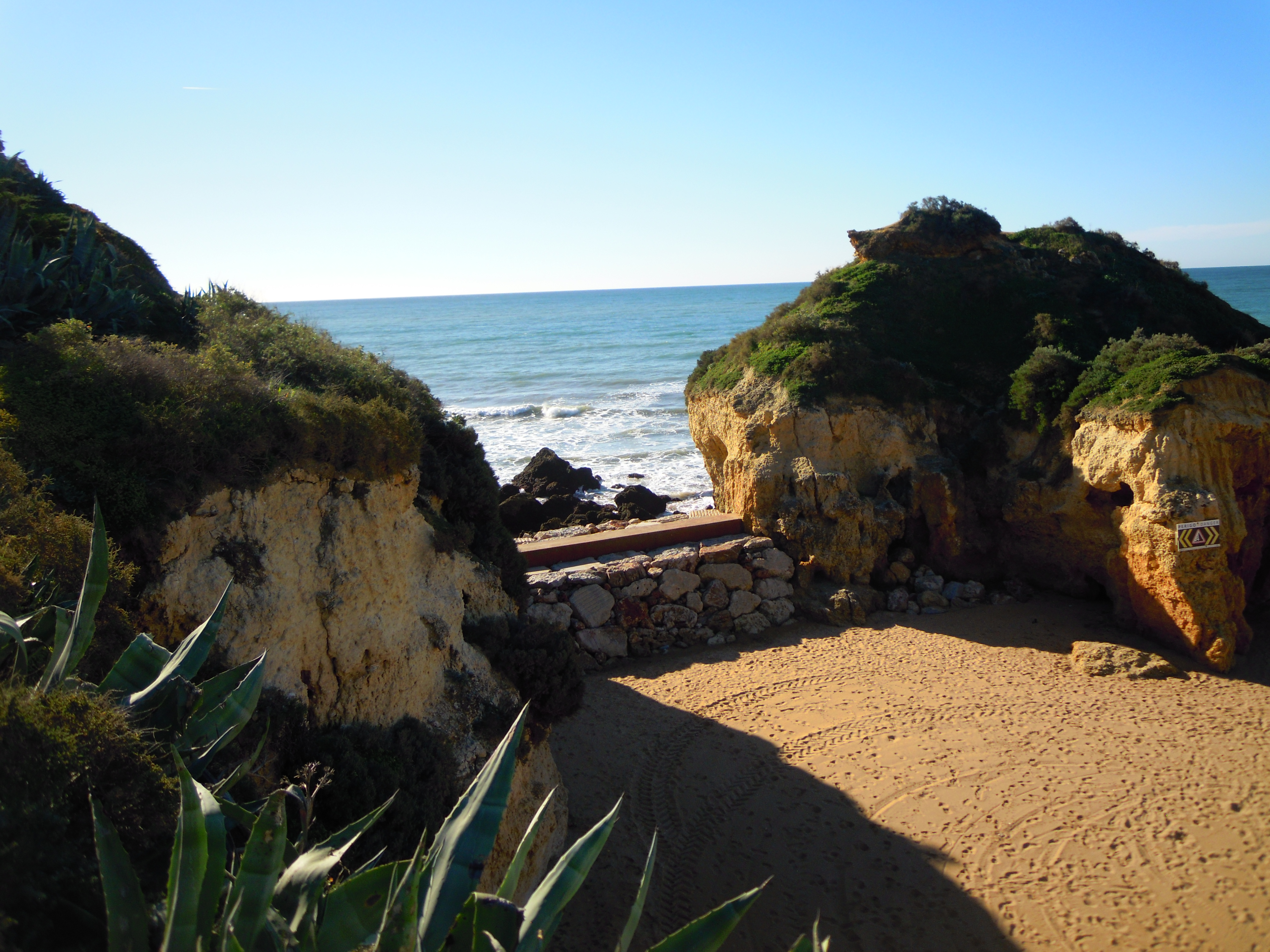
Barrier at the eastern end of the beach constructed to prevent beach erosion.

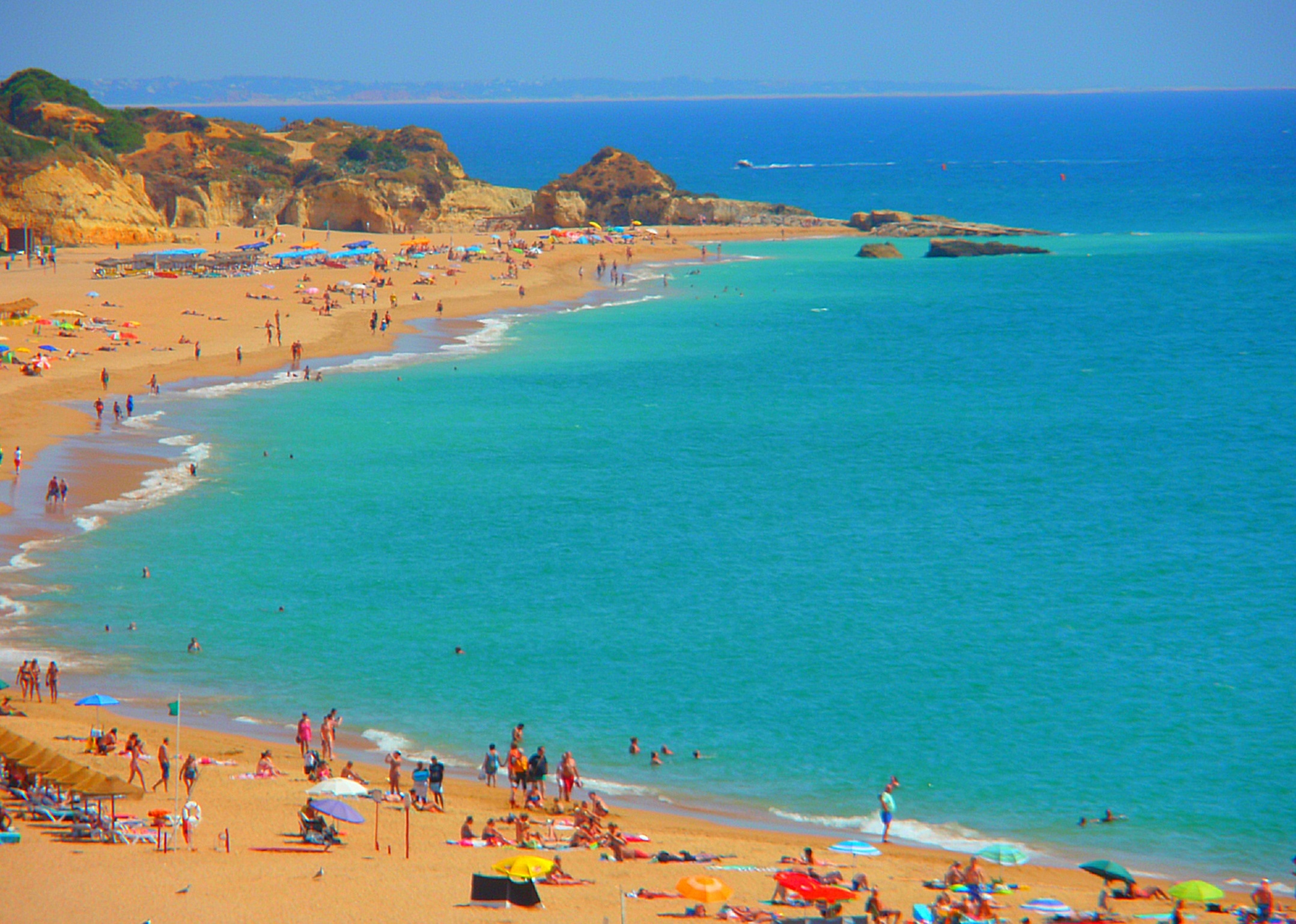
The beach landscape looking eastwards.

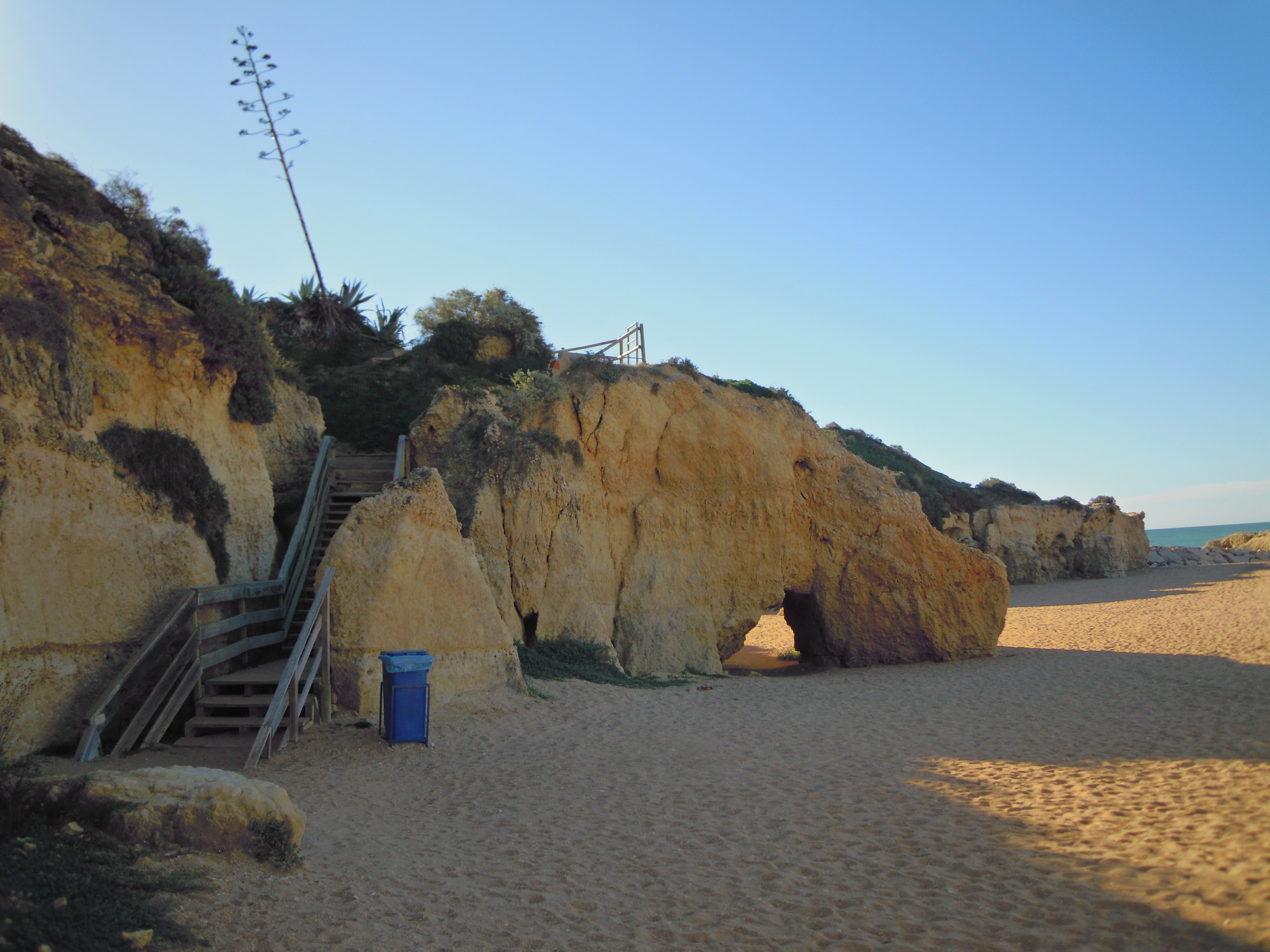
The steps down to the eastern end of Praia dos Alemães from the coast path leading from Praia dos Aveiros.
