= Praia dos Aveiros =

Beach in Portugal

- Beach
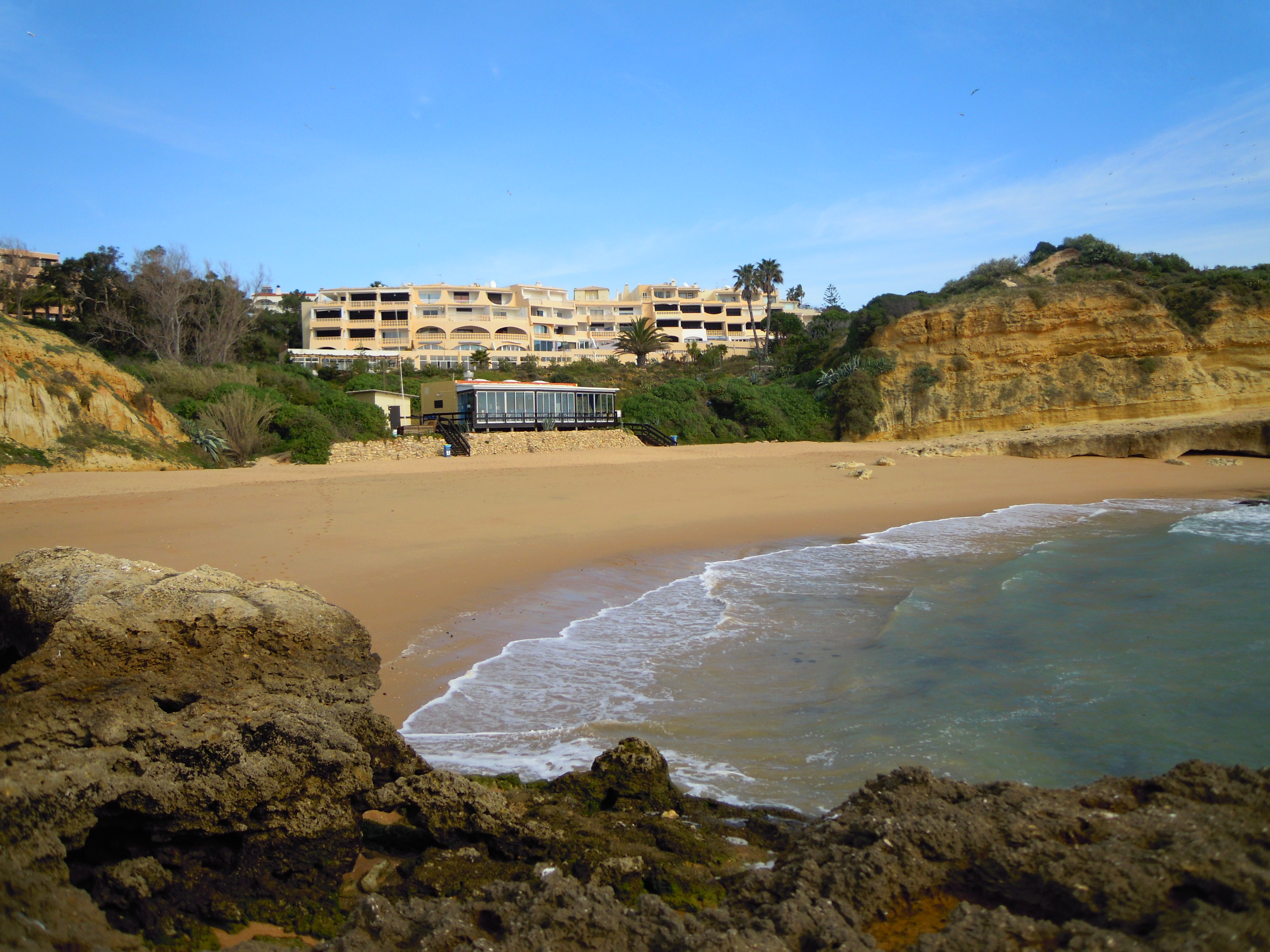
- Praia dos Aveiros

- Coordinates: 37°5′01.3″N 8°13′53.0″W
- Location: Albufeira, Portugal

Praia dos Aveiros is a small blue flag beach in the area called Areias de São João or Saint John's Sands, in the town of Albufeira, Algarve, Portugal. The beach is enclosed in a small cove and is made up of fine golden sands and is flanked at either end by cliffs and rock formations.

== Description ==
This small beach is flanked either side by the larger and busier beaches of Praia da Oura to the east and Praia dos Alemães to the west. These beaches are separated by rocky outcrops but are linked by a coast path at the base of the cliffs but the access along these paths is not suitable for people of limited physical ability. The main foot access to the beach is by means of a footpath which is located to the side of the Hotel Auramar. The path descends down steps to the rear of the beach. There is some limited vehicular access to a small parking area but it is only for local permission holders and to people with blue badges.

== Gallery ==
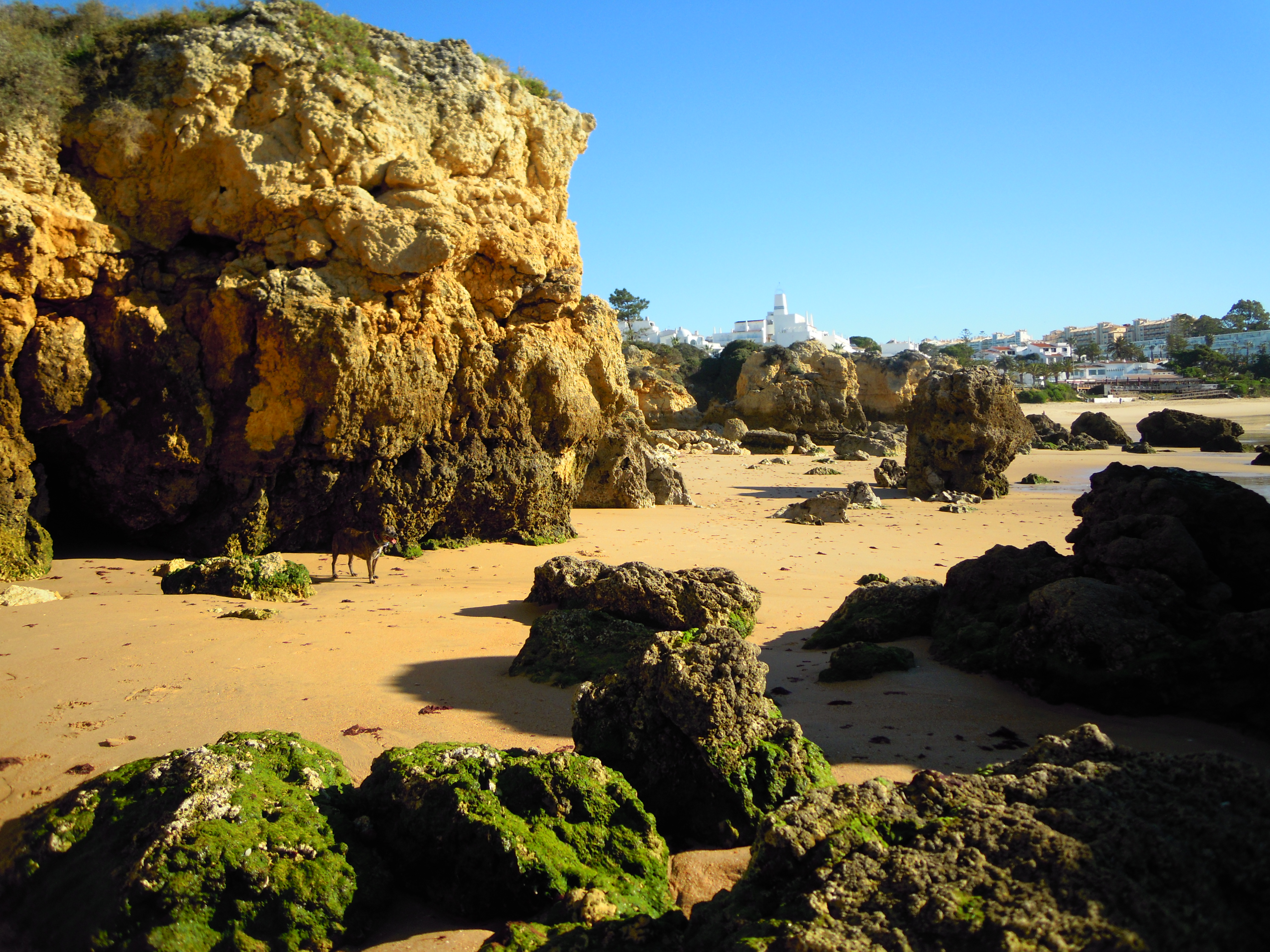
One of the small satellite beaches which lie to the east of the cove many of which are only accessible when the tide is out.

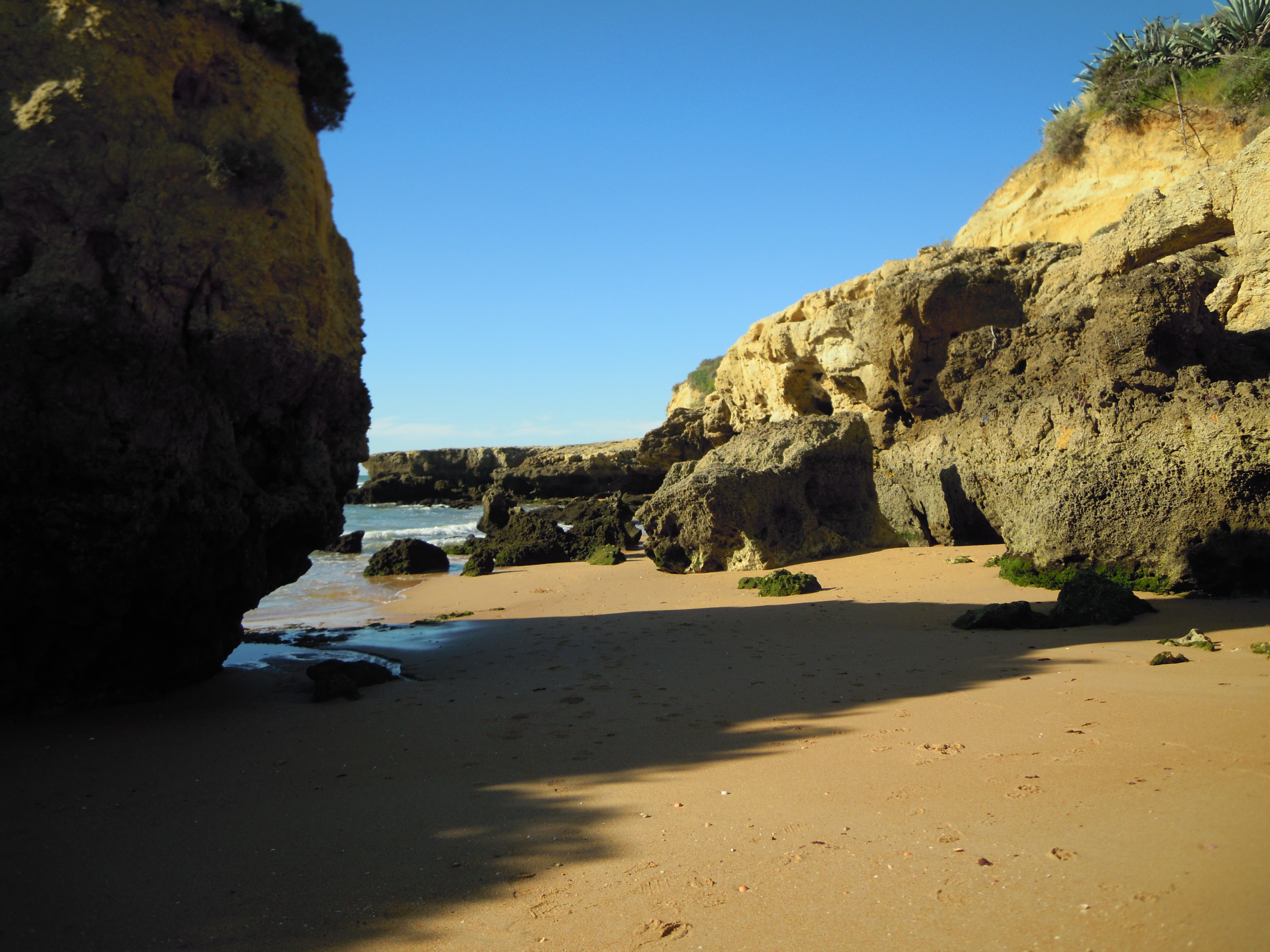
Rock formations and small satellite beach which are a feature of the flanking coastline to the cove.

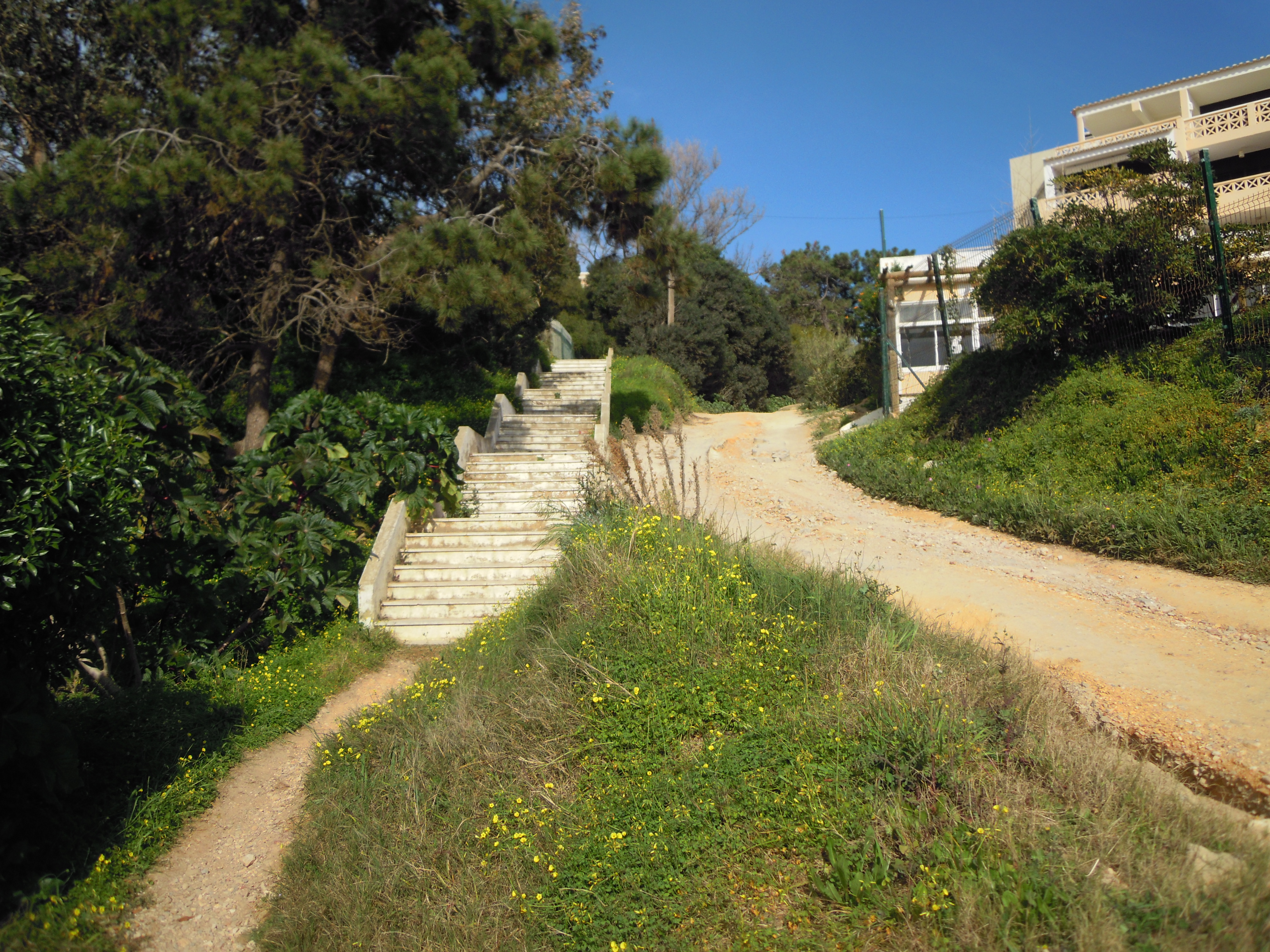
The steps and footpath that lead down to Praia dos Aveiros from the Beco Vasco da Gama.

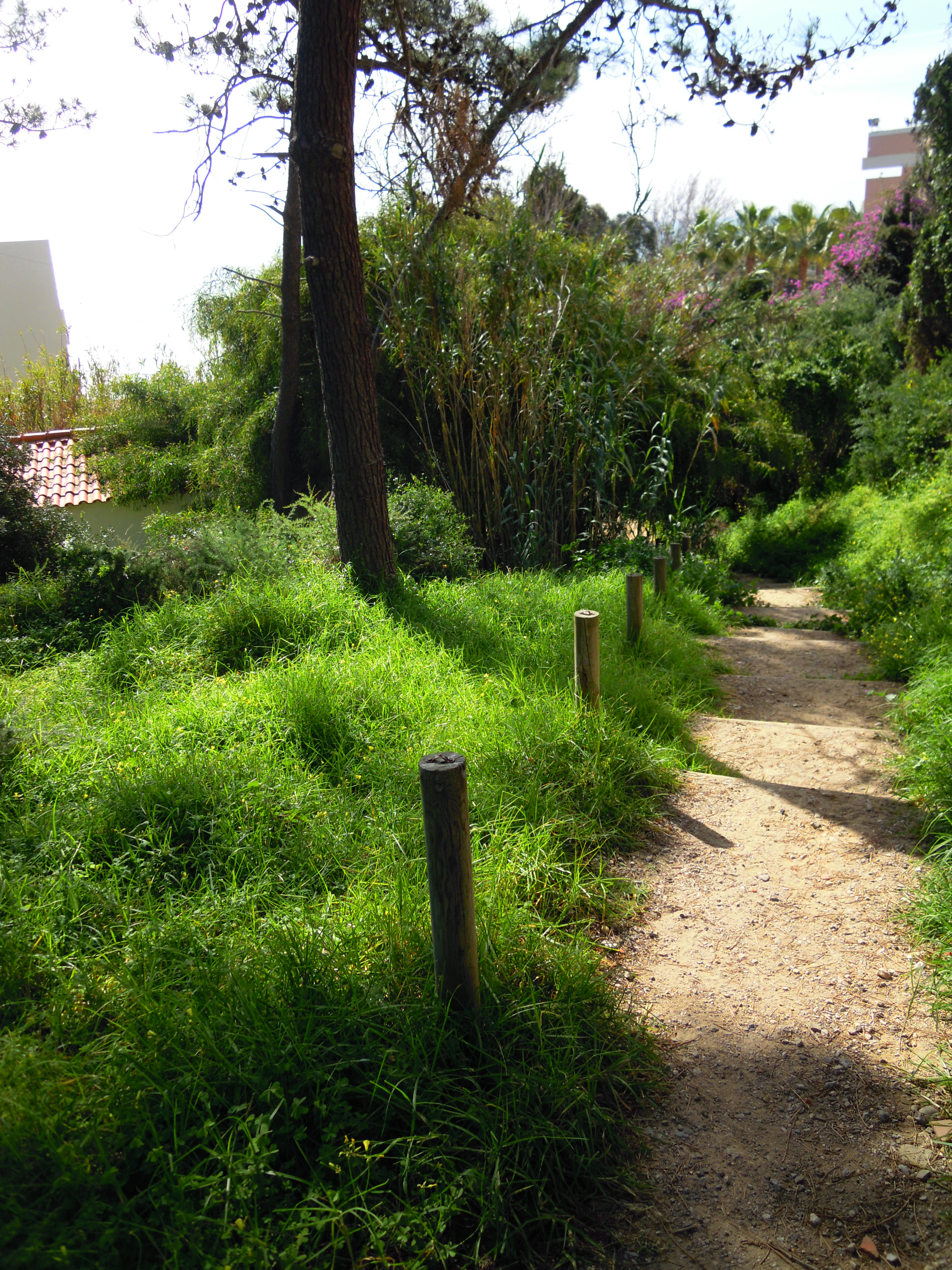
Looking south down the path that leads to the Praia dos Aveiros from the Beco Vasco da Gama.

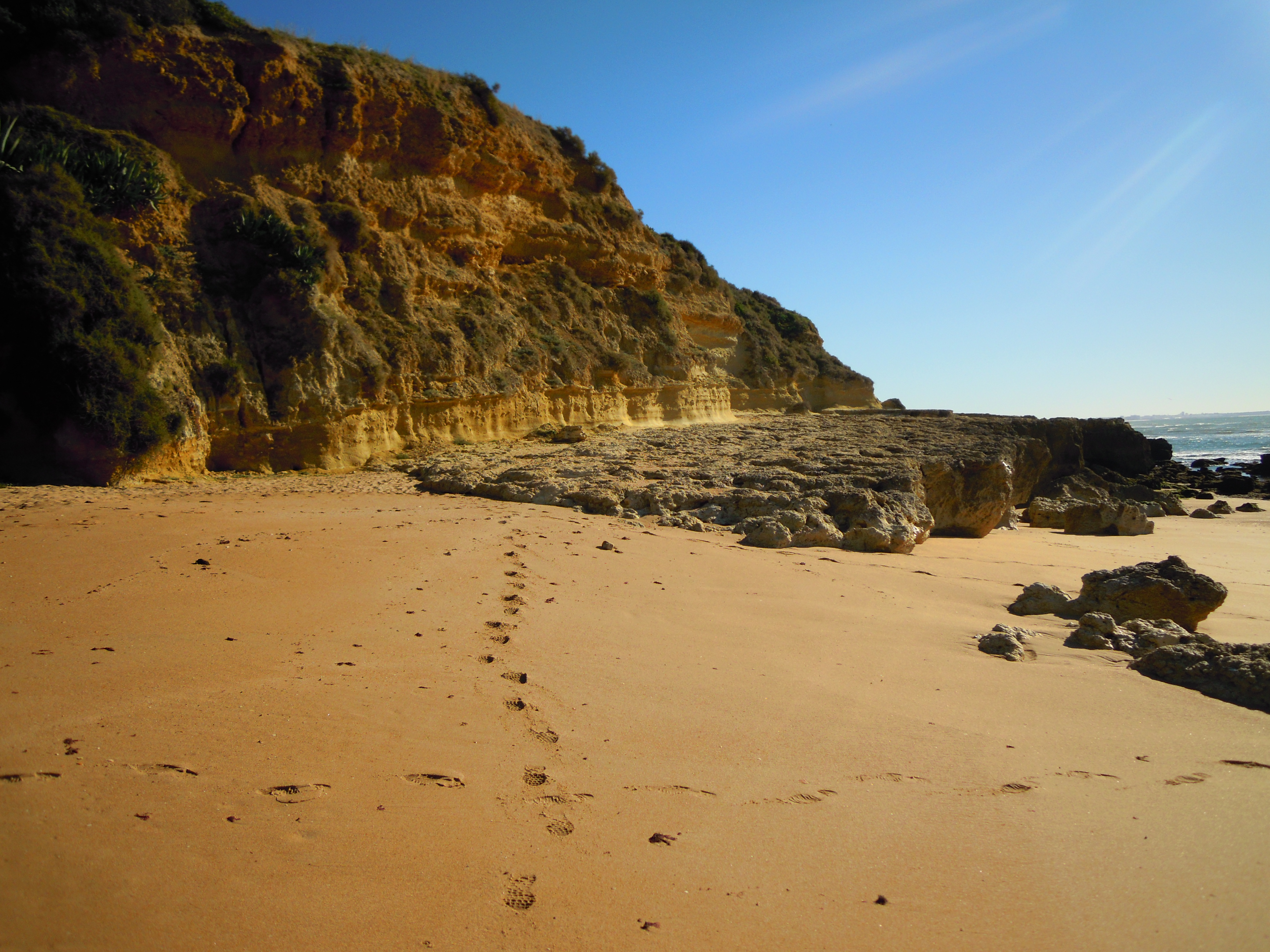
The start of the footpath that runs along the cliffs towards Praia da Oura east of Aveiros.

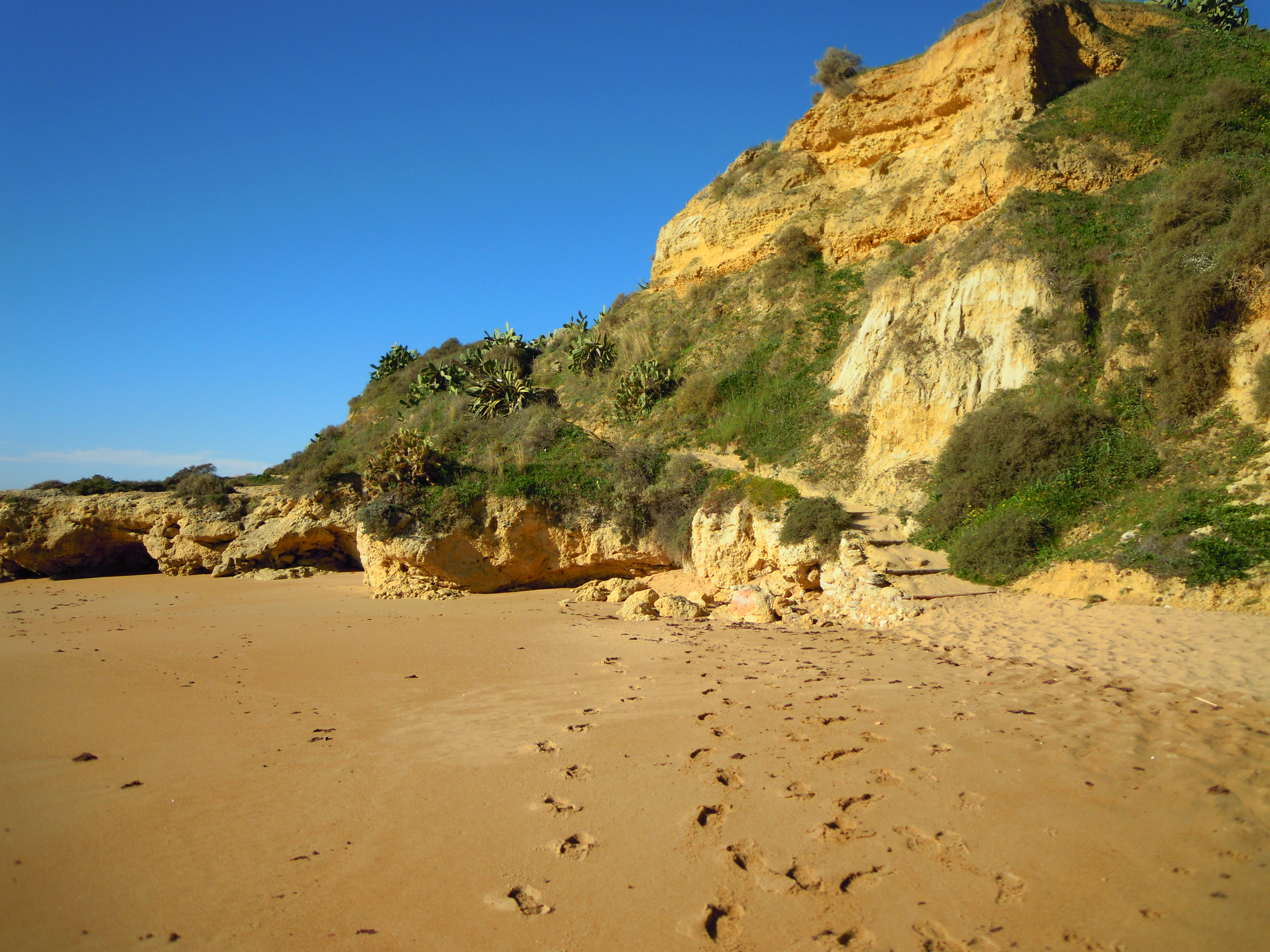
the start of the footpath that heads west across the cliffs and coast towards Albufeira old town and to Praia dos Alemães.
