= Praia dos Pescadores (Albufeira) =

Beach in the Algarve, Portugal

- Beach
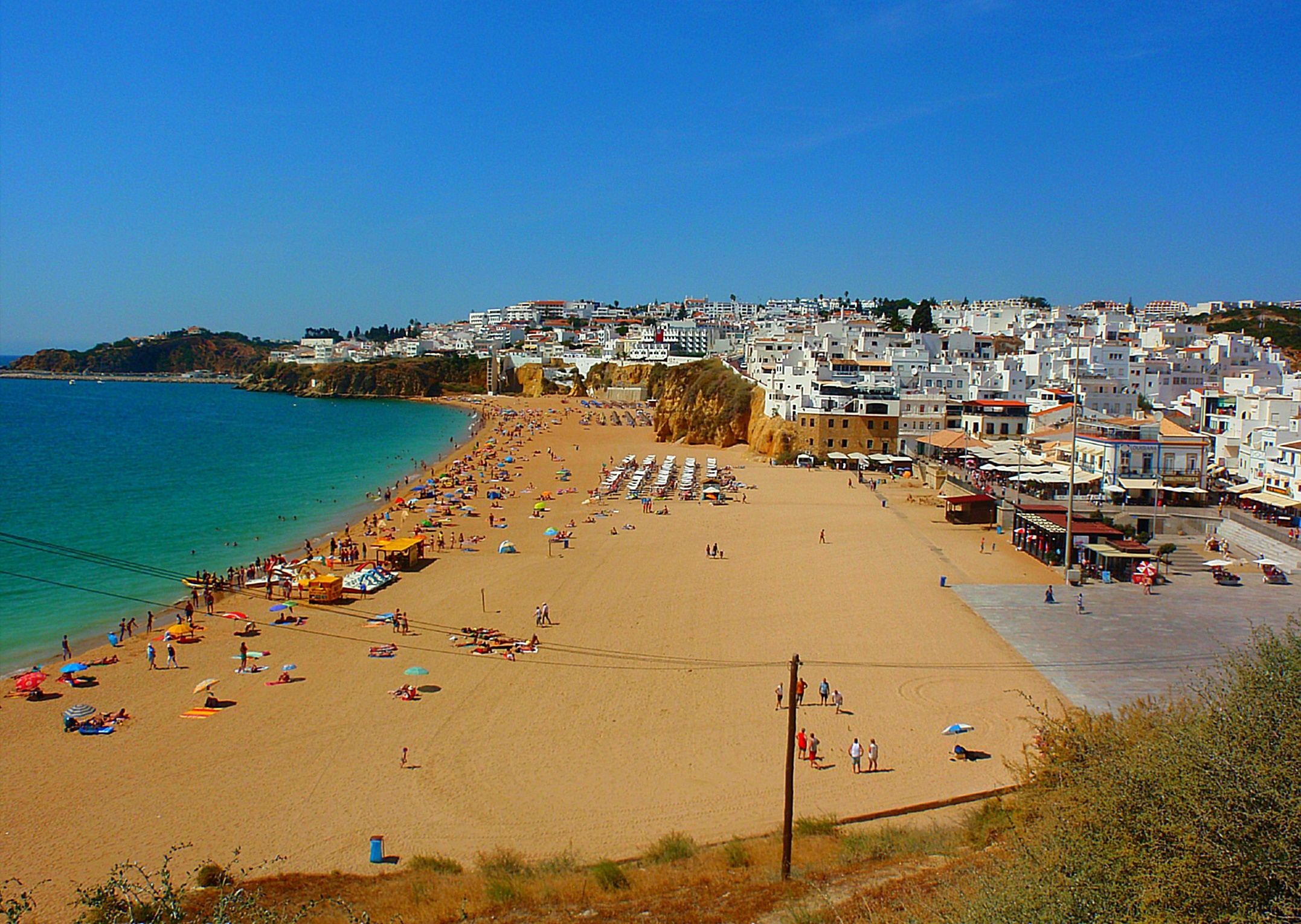
- Praia dos Pescadores

- Location within Portugal
- Coordinates: 37°05′11″N 8°15′00″W
- Location: Albufeira, Algarve, Portugal

Praia dos Pescadores or the Fishermans Beach is a blue flag beach on the Atlantic south coast of the Algarve, in the district of Bairro dos Pescadores (Neighborhood of the Fisherman), Albufeira which is within the Municipality of Albufeira, Portugal. The beach is one of the two beaches which front the town of Albufeira with Praia do Túnel at the western end and Praia dos Pescadores lying to the eastern end of the towns seafront. The town and its beaches are located west 23.9 miles (38.5 km) by road of the regions capital of Faro.

== Description ==
In the days before Albufeira had a harbour and mariner the Praia dos Pescadores was where all the local fishermen operated from and the beach scene would have been very different to the site you see today. Then the beach would have been full of brightly painted fishing boats pulled up on this beach when not at sea and much of the tourist activities took place on the Praia do Túnel. Today the Praia dos Pescadores is now used for tourism and is a very busy beach especially in the summer season.

The beach is 225 metres (738 ft) in length and is 106 metres (348 ft) wide at low tide. The beach is divided by a protruding cliff from Praia do Túnel at the western end of the seafront. To the beaches eastern boundary is the Praia do Inatel and it is divided from that beach by a concrete pier which covers the outflow of the Ribeira de Albufeira (Albufeira River). There are also cliffs at the eastern end and to the back of the beach there is an amphitheatre of white houses of the district of Bairro dos Pescadores. The beach can also be accessed by an outdoor foot escalator from the Pau da Bandeira bluff located south of Bairro dos Pescadores down to the beach and Albufeira old town.

== Beach facilities ==
Praia dos Pescadores is an easily accessed beach with its large hard surface square at beach level. There are two car park's near-by, one of which, is at beach level, a short distance along the Avenida 25 de Abril within the old town. The second car park is at the top of the cliffs at Bairro dos Pescadores and is accessed via the outdoor escalator. To the back of the western end of the beach there a variety of restaurants many of which specialise in the local fish and seafood. The beach has several licensed concessions with opportunities to hire parasols and sun loungers. There are also many organised beach and water sport concessions from volleyball to boat trips and Parasailing. The beach also has toilet and shower facilities. During the summer months the beach is patrolled by lifeguards.

== New Year Celebrations on the beach ==
In recent years the beach has been the focal point for the new year celebrations in the town. A temporary concert stage is erected on the Largo 25 de Abril and concerts are held to celebrate the new year. In the past the celebration has seen international bands appearing such as British reggae/pop band UB40 in 2009. The celebrations cumulate with a firework display held just of the beach on boats and pontoons just of the shoreline.

== Gallery ==
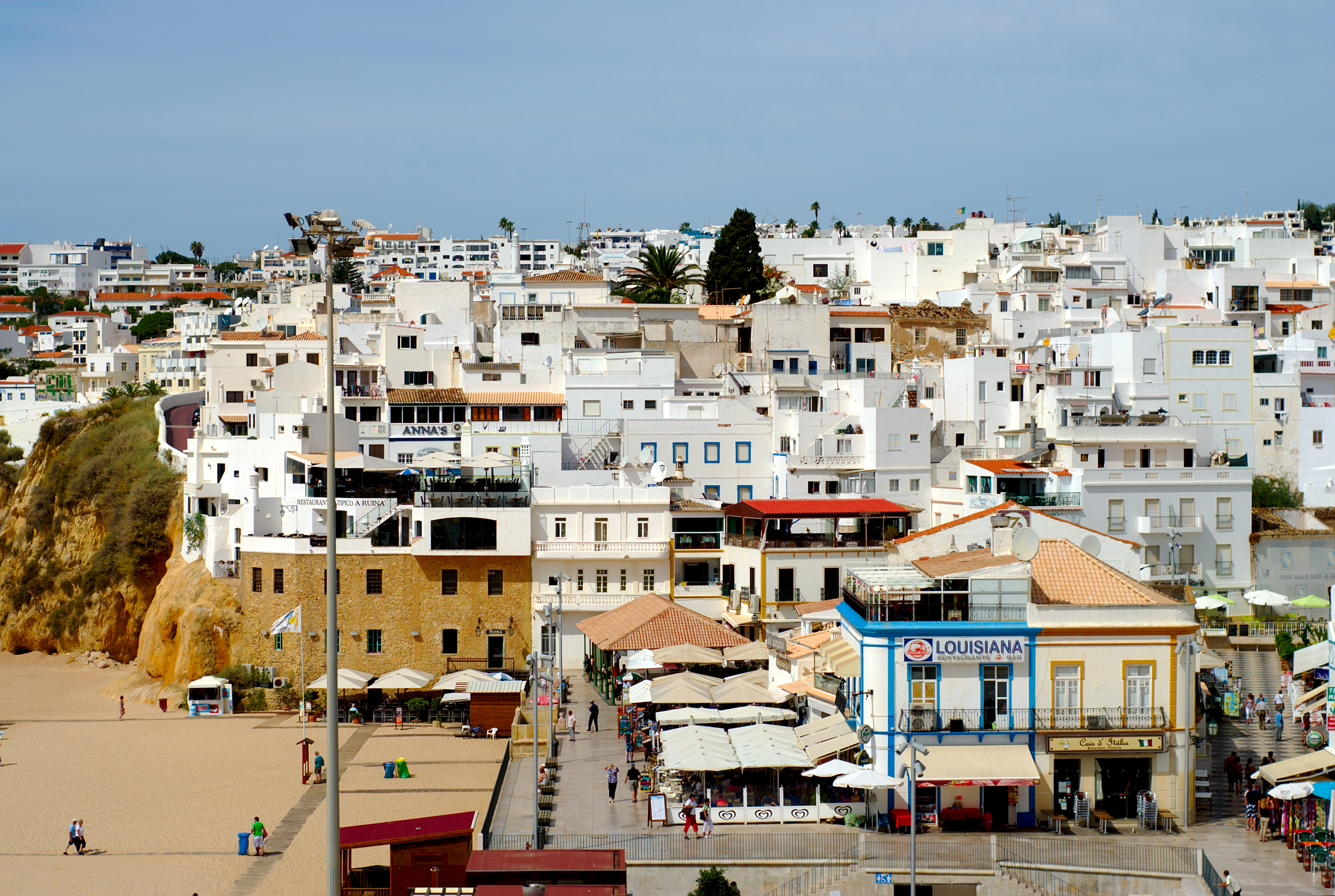
The western end of the beach

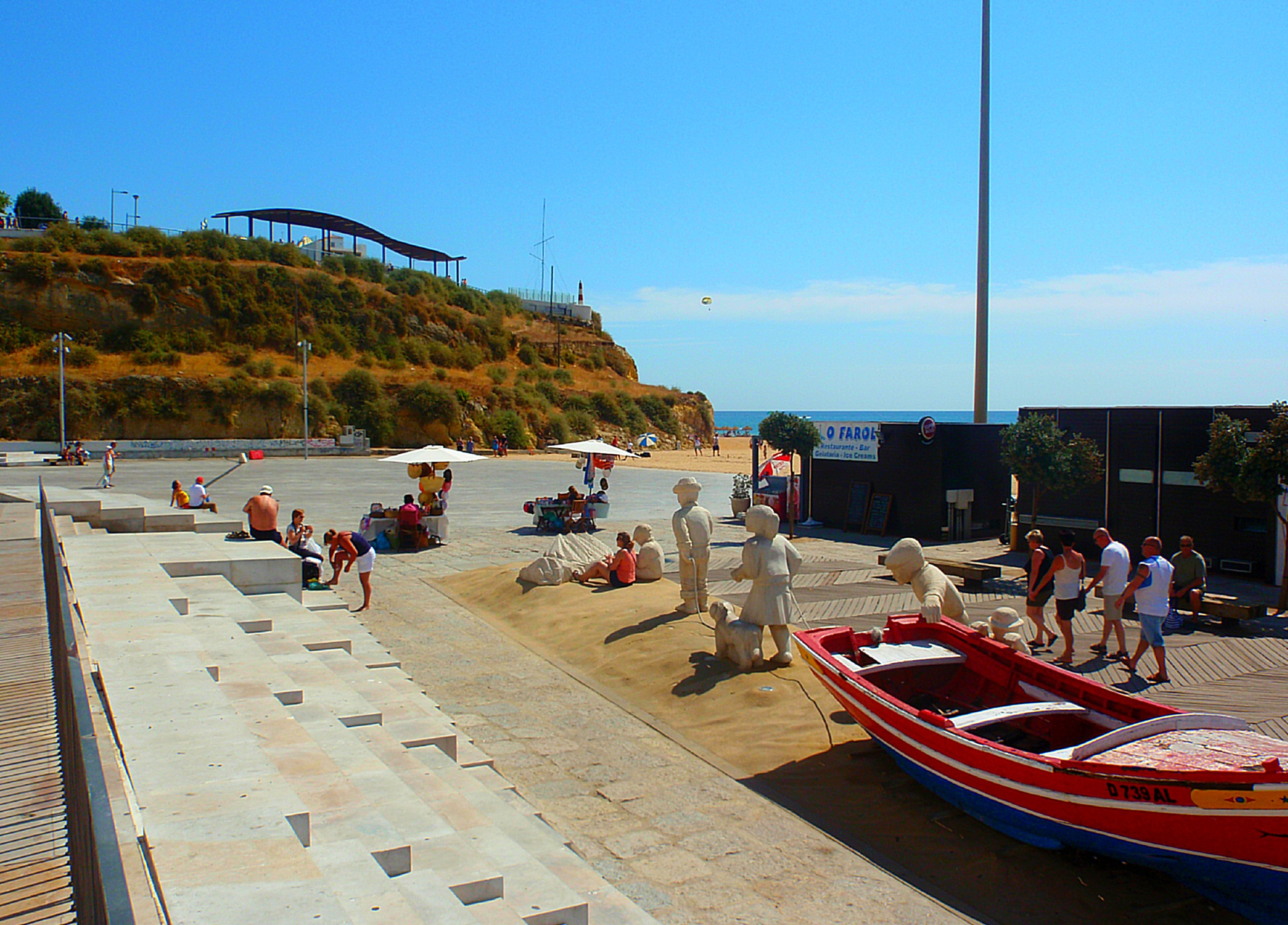
The eastern end of the beach

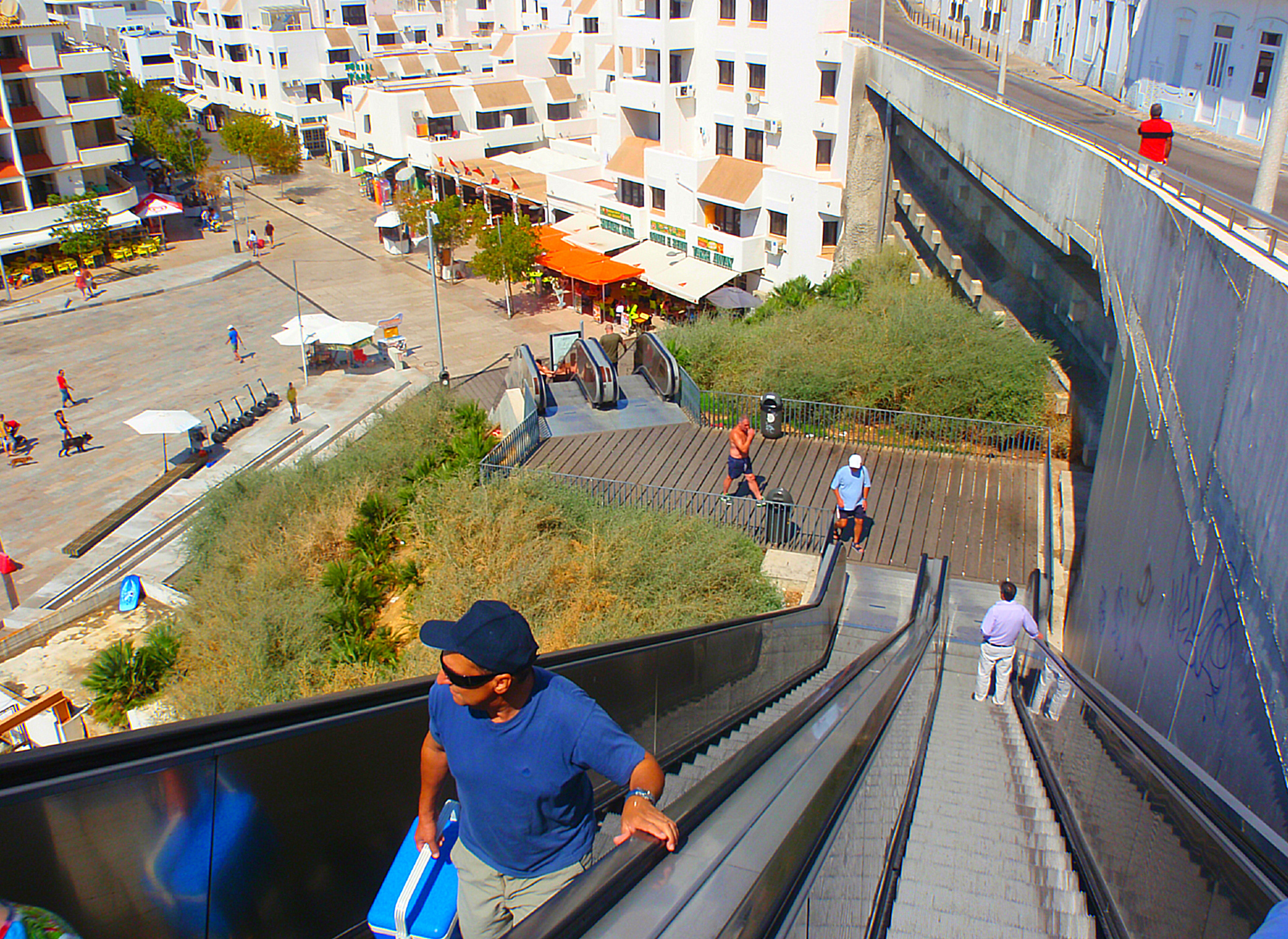
The escalator down from Pau da Bandeira bluff located south of Bairro dos Pescadores down to the beach and Albufeira old town.

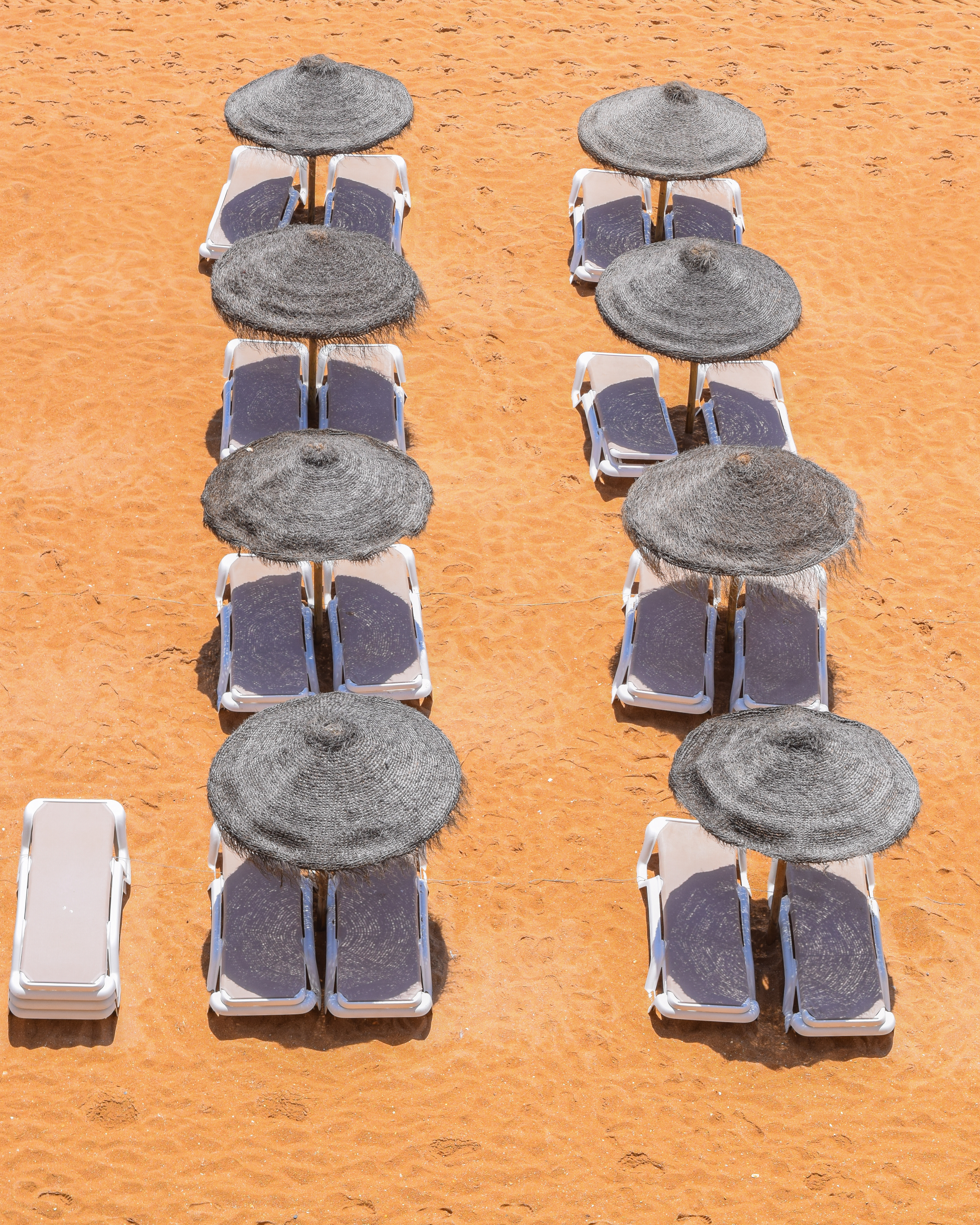
Chairs and umbrellas in Praia dos Pescadores
