= Praia do Túnel (Peneco) =

Beach in Portugal

- Beach
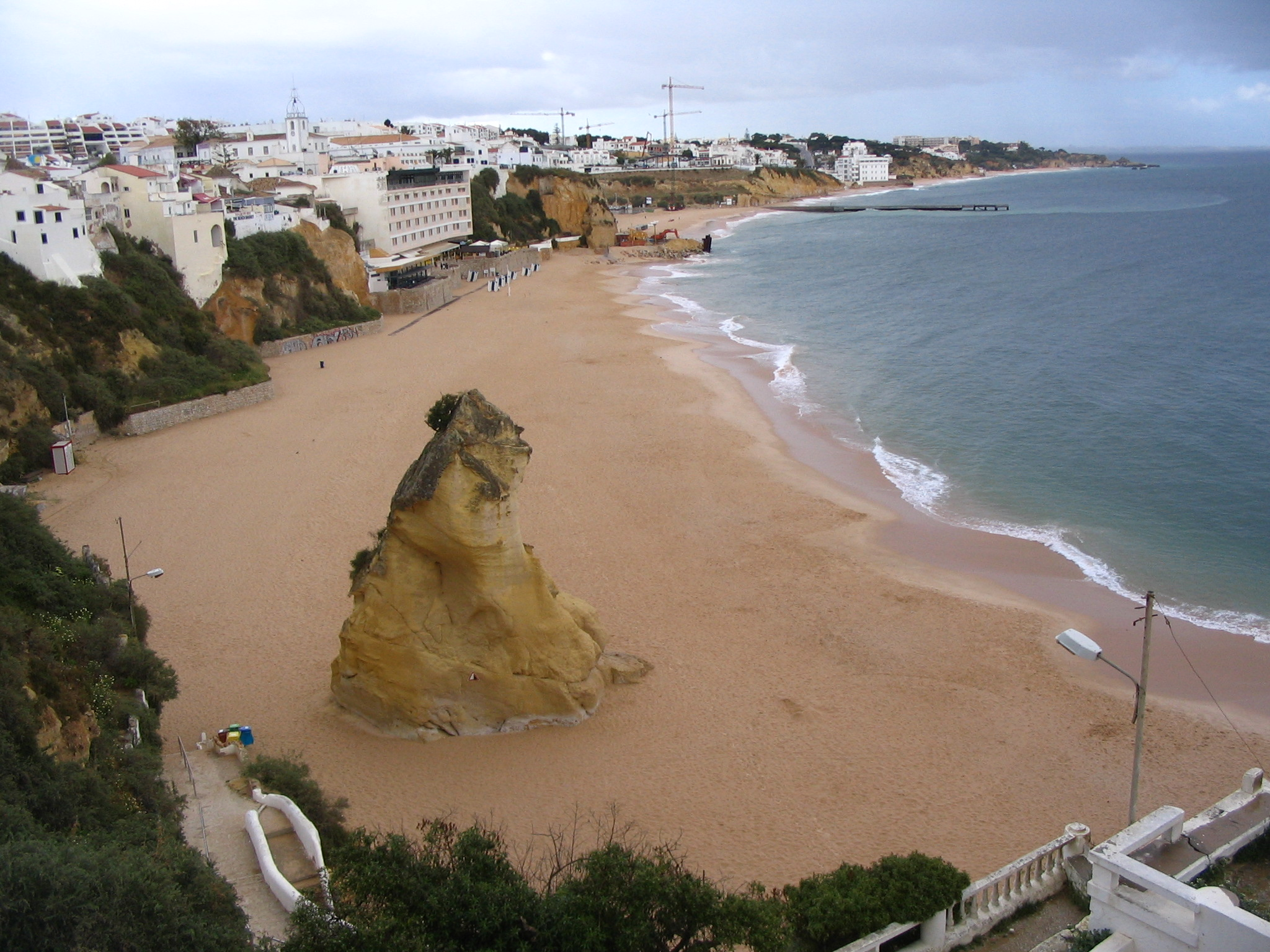
- Praia do Túnel

- Location within Portugal
- Coordinates: 37°5′11.14″N 8°15′13.65″W
- Location: Albufeira, Algarve, Portugal

Praia do Túnel is a beach on the Atlantic south coast of the Algarve, in the town of Albufeira which is within the Municipality of Albufeira, Portugal. The beach is also known as Praia do Peneco and is one of the two beaches which front the town of Albufeira with Praia do Túnel at the western end and Praia dos Pescadores lying to the eastern end of the towns seafront. The town and its beaches are located west 23.9 miles (38.5 km) by road of the regions capital of Faro.

== Description ==
The beach gets its name from a 20 meter long tunnel next to the tourist office in the middle of Albufeira which cuts through the cliffs linking the towns square to the beach. At the western end of the beach there is a promenade which ends at the cave known as the Xorino Grotto. According to 13th-century legend, the cave was used as shelter by the Moors after the Christian conquest of Albufeira. Besides the tunnel, there are several other points of access to the beach including a lift, ramps and steps.

=== Facilities ===
During the summer season the beach is patrolled by lifeguards. There are Loungers, parasols and Pedalo's which can be hired. The beach has good access for the disabled.

== Gallery ==
Praia do Túnel

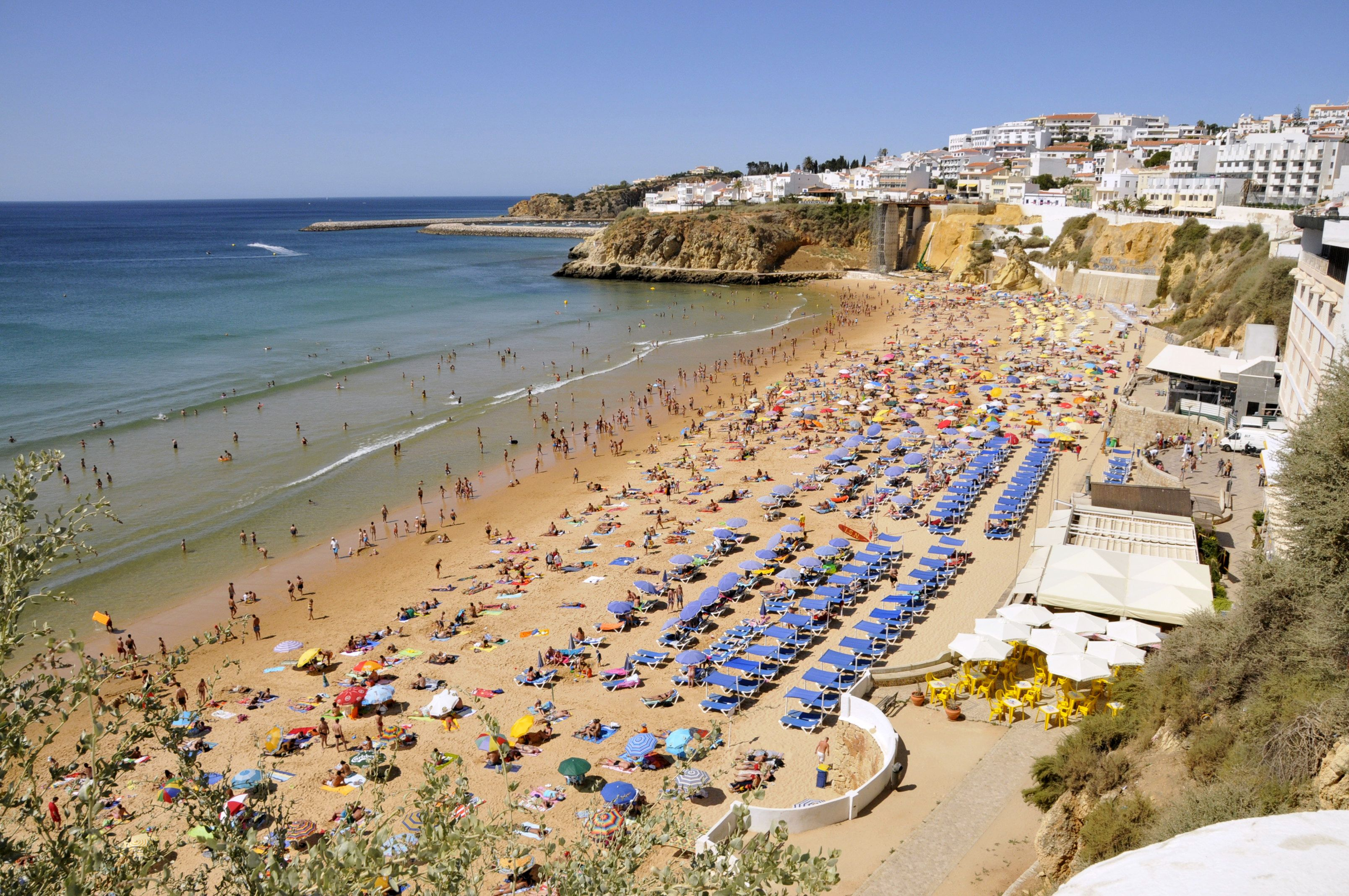
The beach in the summer season

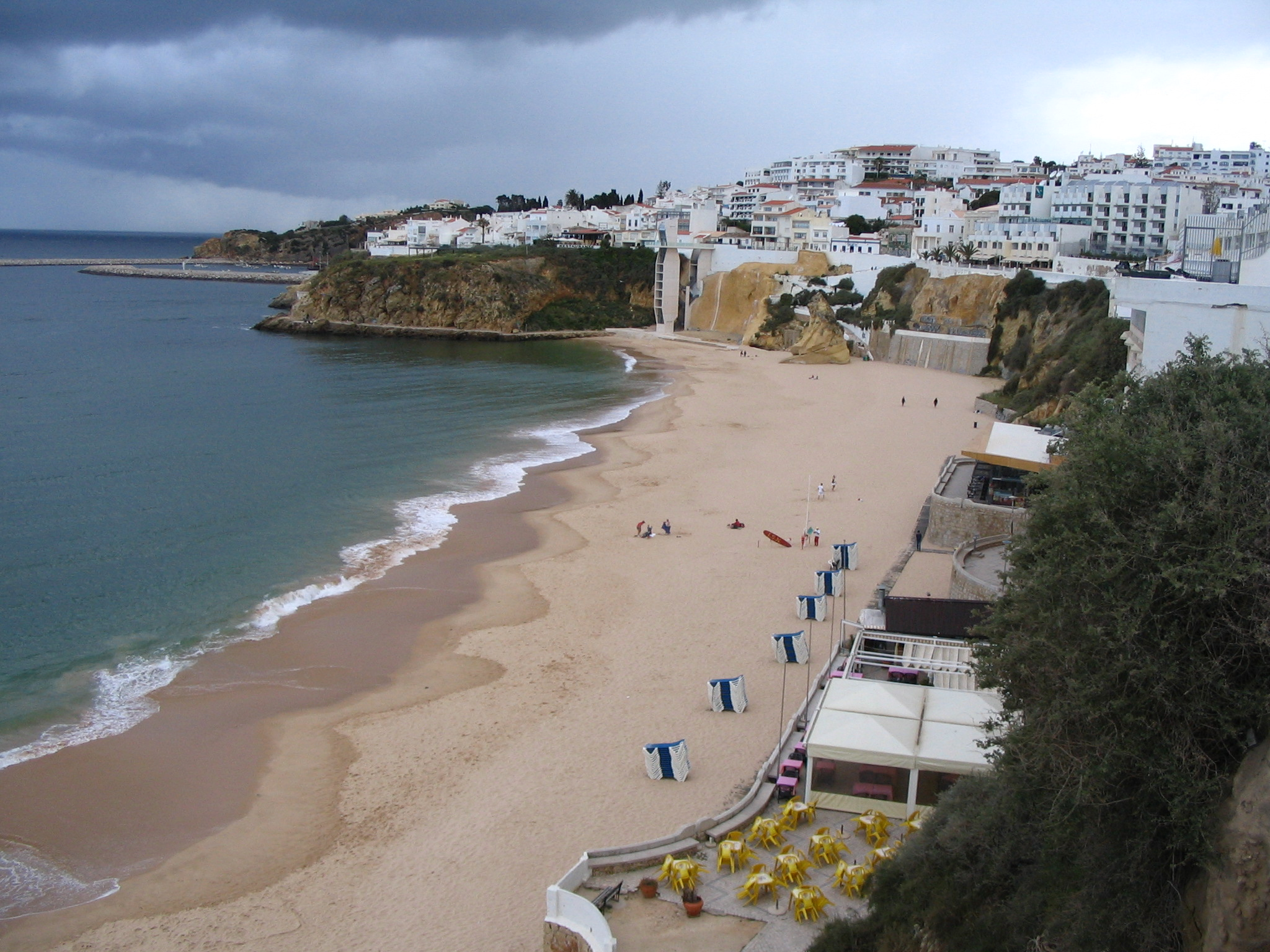
Looking westwards

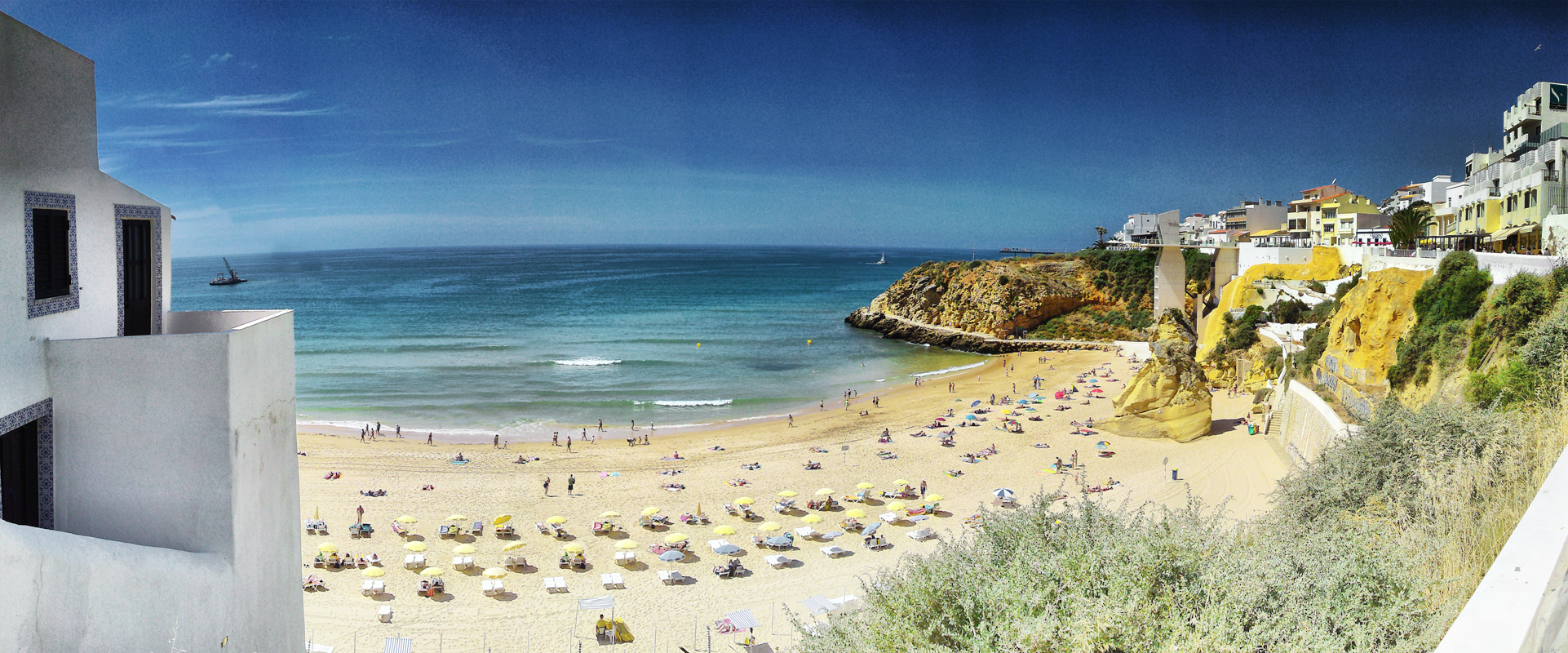
