= Praia da Angrinha (Ferragudo) =

Beach in Portugal

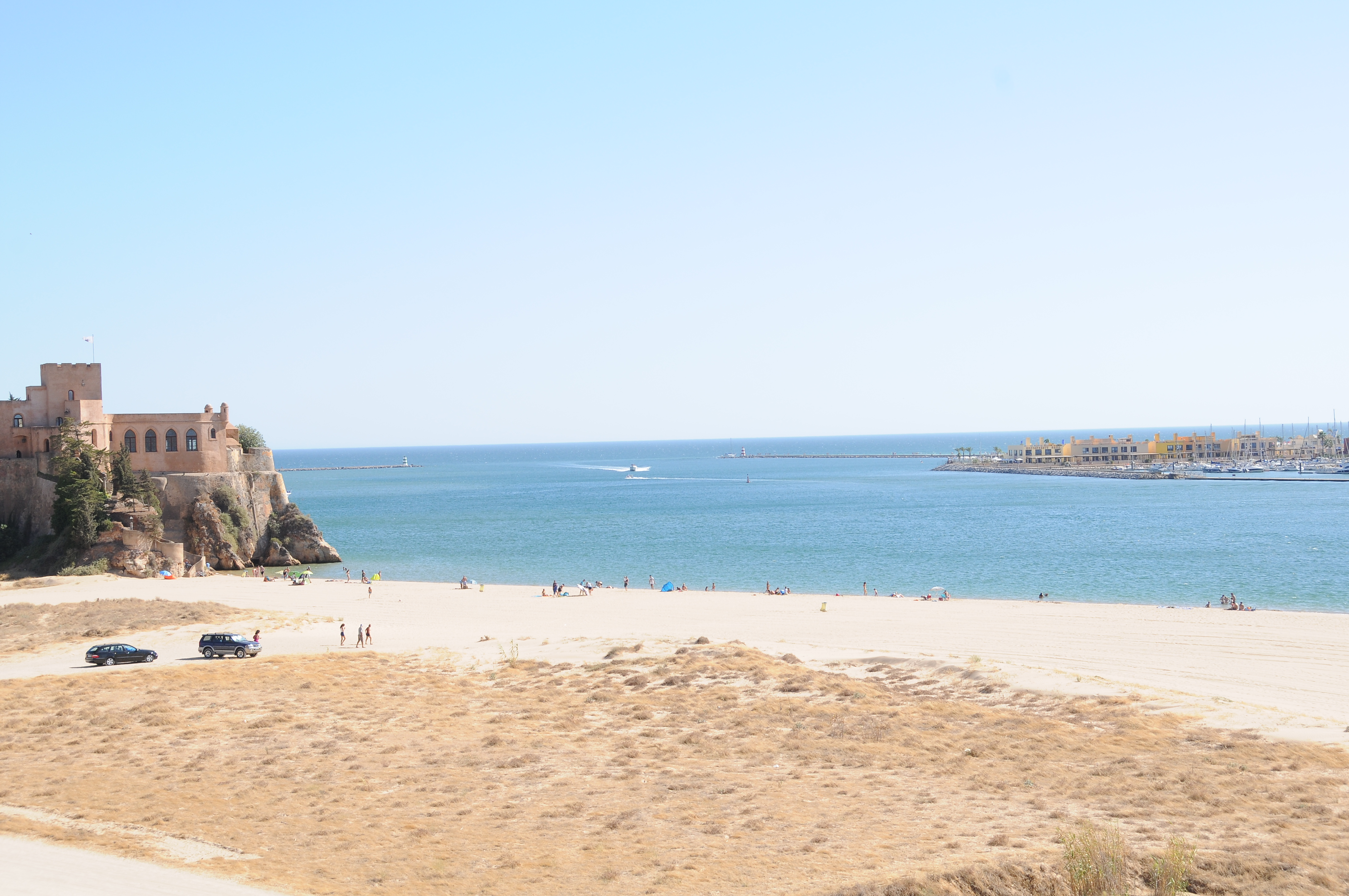

Praia da Angrinha (English: Angrinha Beach) is situated along the wide estuary of the Arade River, south of Ferragudo, in Lagoa Municipality, Portugal.

Map location: 37°07′12″N 8°31′20″W

Protected by the large moles extending out towards the Portimão shore opposite, the beach is long and enclosed by heights in the land, now much eroded by the elements. The rocky walls are covered with vegetation, particularly plants which are adapted to the salty environment, such as kelp and saltbush (Atriplex), or plants typical of dune areas, such as trefoil (Lotus creticus), which colonize the small rocky cavities where sand accumulates.

At the north end of the beach is the Forte de São João do Arade, which, in conjunction with the Forte de Santa Catarina on the other side of the river, guaranteed the defense of the river estuary. The beach itself has served as a landing place for traditional fishing boats plying the river and the open sea.
