= Fort of São João do Arade =

Medieval fortification in the Portugal

- Forte de São João do Arade
- Faro, Algarve, Algarve in Portugal
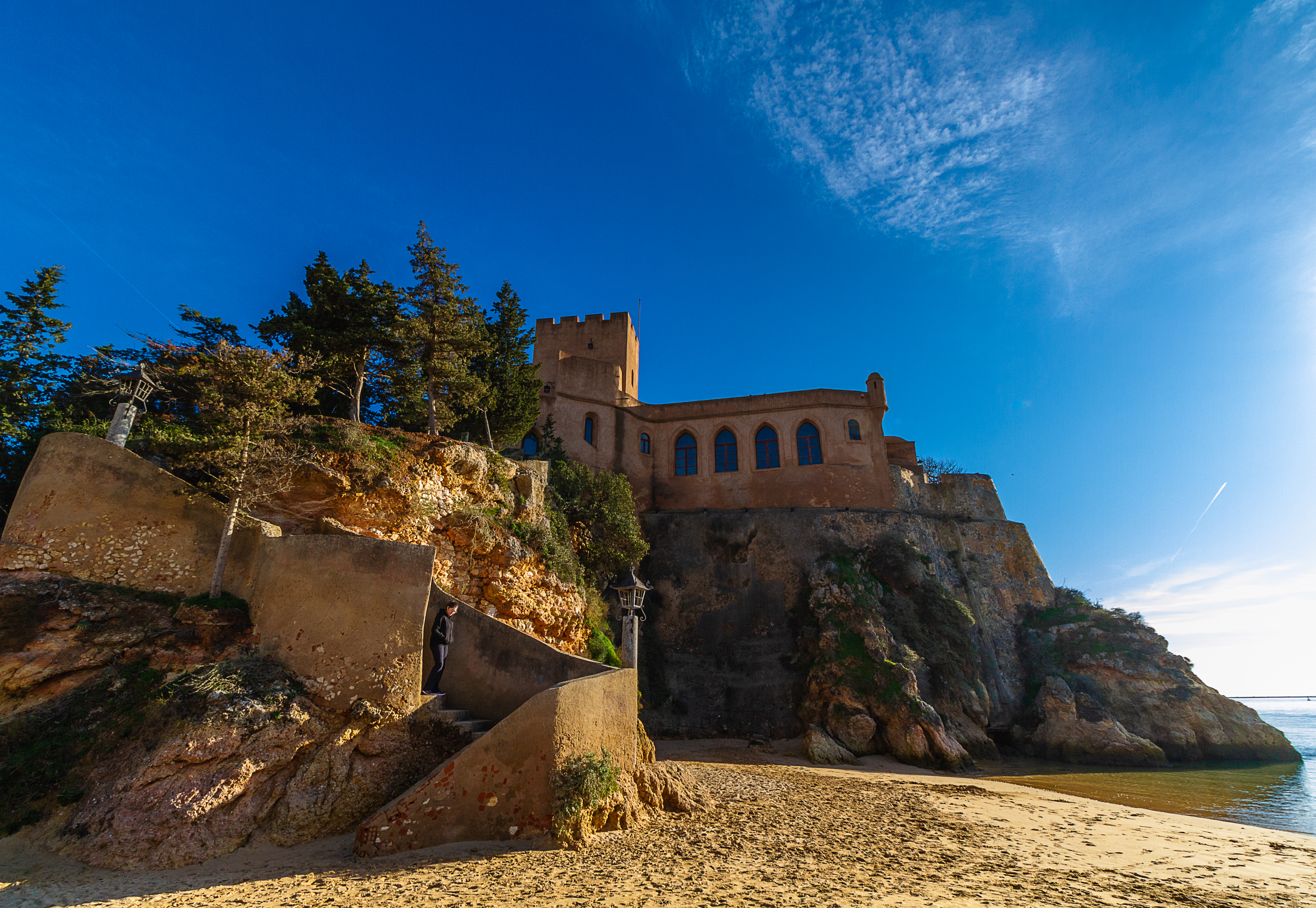
- The Fort of São João do Arade

Site information
- Type: Fort
- Owner: Portuguese Republic
- Operator: Junta de Freguesia de Ferregudo
- Open to the public: Private

Location
- Coordinates: 37°7′10.55″N 8°31′21.21″W

Site history
- Built: c. 1520
- Materials: Stone, Masonry

The Fort of São João do Arade (Portuguese: Forte de São João do Arade), sometimes referred to as the Castle of Arade, is a medieval fortification situated in the civil parish of Ferragudo in the Portuguese Algarve municipality of Lagoa.

== History ==
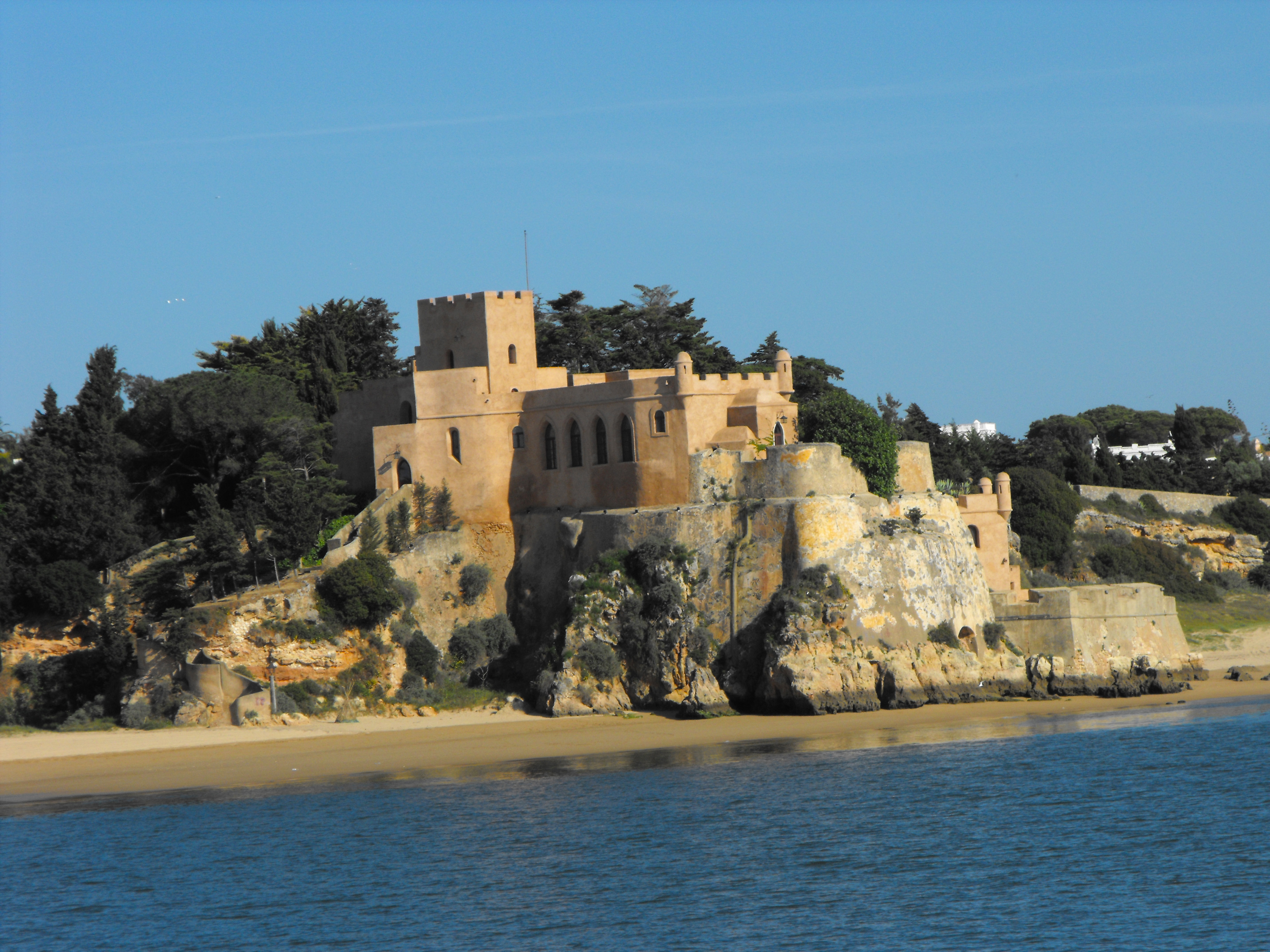
The oceanfront façade of the Fort of São João de Arade, showing the rock foundation on which it was built

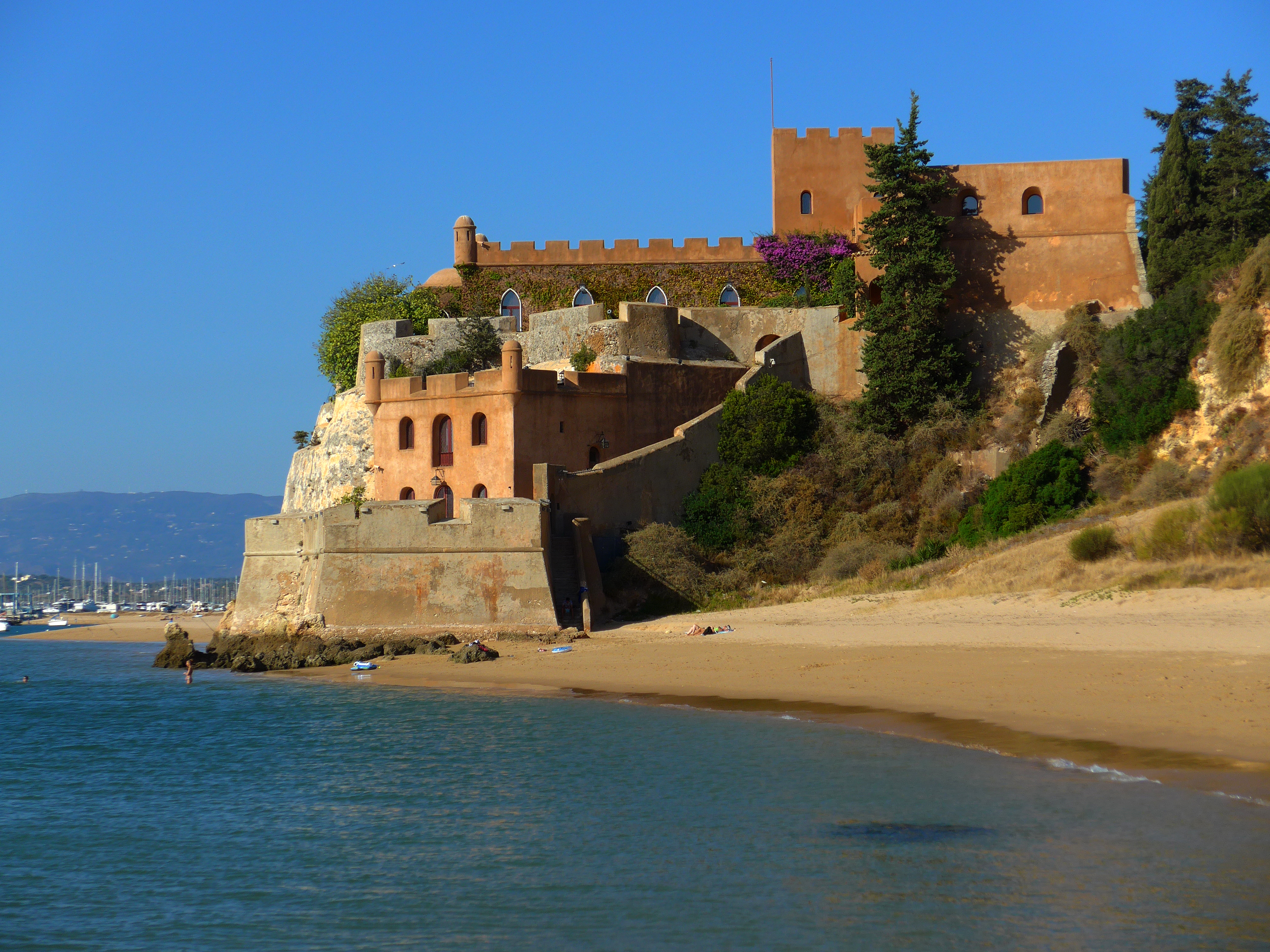
The multi-tiered battlements and barbicans, as seen from Praia Grande beach

The first fortification on the site consisted of a watch tower erected in the reign of King John II of Portugal. Later, following the settlement of Ferragudo (around 1520), it is believed that the castle was encircled by a defensive wall (built on the rudimentary walls of the older walls): giving rise to its original name Castle of Arade.

The origins of the Fort of Arade (or Ferragudo, as it is also known) date back to the Philippine Dynasty, and the need by the Habsburg rulers to defend the coast of the peninsula from attacks by pirates and privateers in service to the Crowns of northern Europe. Yet, even at the beginning decades of the 17th century, no fortress was constructed owing to the indecision on whether to locate the fortification on the left or right margin (location of Vila Nova de Portimão).

Engineer Alexandre Massai defended a new construction in Portimão, while the left margin proposal (in Ferragudo) was defended by the municipality of Silves. According to a report by Alexandre Massai, the battlements already existed in 1621, since he refers to “um sítio cercado chamado Ferragudo” (“a walled site called Ferragudo”).

The Portuguese Restoration War, once again, justified the construction of a new fortress. It was in 1640 that the order to construct a fortification came down from King John IV; the fortress was built to substitute the Castle of Ferragudo (Portuguese: Castelo de Ferragudo) which had lost its effectiveness. This bulwark was erected downstream on a rocky platform, but the effects of erosion and Atlantic storms (especially a violent storm in 1669) caused severe damage to the original bulwark.

Within four years (2 May 1644), the first captain was assigned to the fort: Francisco da Costa Barros. The strategic location of this castle, from the beginning, made the fortress more than just a military structure. The fort controlled a privileged place at the mouth of the River Arade, with the capacity to strike as far as the margins of Portimão.

An inspection carried-out by the Governor of the Kingdom of the Algarve, D. Rodrigo António de Noronha e Meneses, considered the fortification to be in perfect condition. At that time there were two artillery batteries: the lower battery, with three pieces of artillery; and the upper battery, with four pieces. The 1755 Lisbon earthquake did not result in any damages, in comparison to many of the buildings/structures along the southern coast, partly due to its construction on soft rock. By 1821, the fort remained active, referencing two, heavily armed batteries on its upper tier.

The area was also a transit point for boats leaving the river, making it a responsible for fluvial traffic that entered and left Silves. But, this role was fleeting; after the Concession of Evoramonte, the fort fell into disuse and was declassified in 1896. Its history since then was of slow deterioration and abandon, that culminated in 1896, with its public sale: it was sold at a public auction for 600,000 reis.

Untouched throughout the 20th century, the group of structures maintained there state, waiting on rigorous studies and archaeological investigation. After its sale, it was adapted as a summer residence, by the poet Coelho Carvalho, who undertook extensive renovations to create a residence reflecting his personal taste. Still in private hands, it was classified in 1975 as a historic building by the Instituto Português do Património Arquitectónico (IPPAR), forerunner of the IGESPAR.

But, today, it is practically abandoned: the local authority petitioned for its transformation into cultural centre; in 1976, the Junta Freguesia de Ferragudo solicited the national government in order to occupy the fort.

== Architecture ==
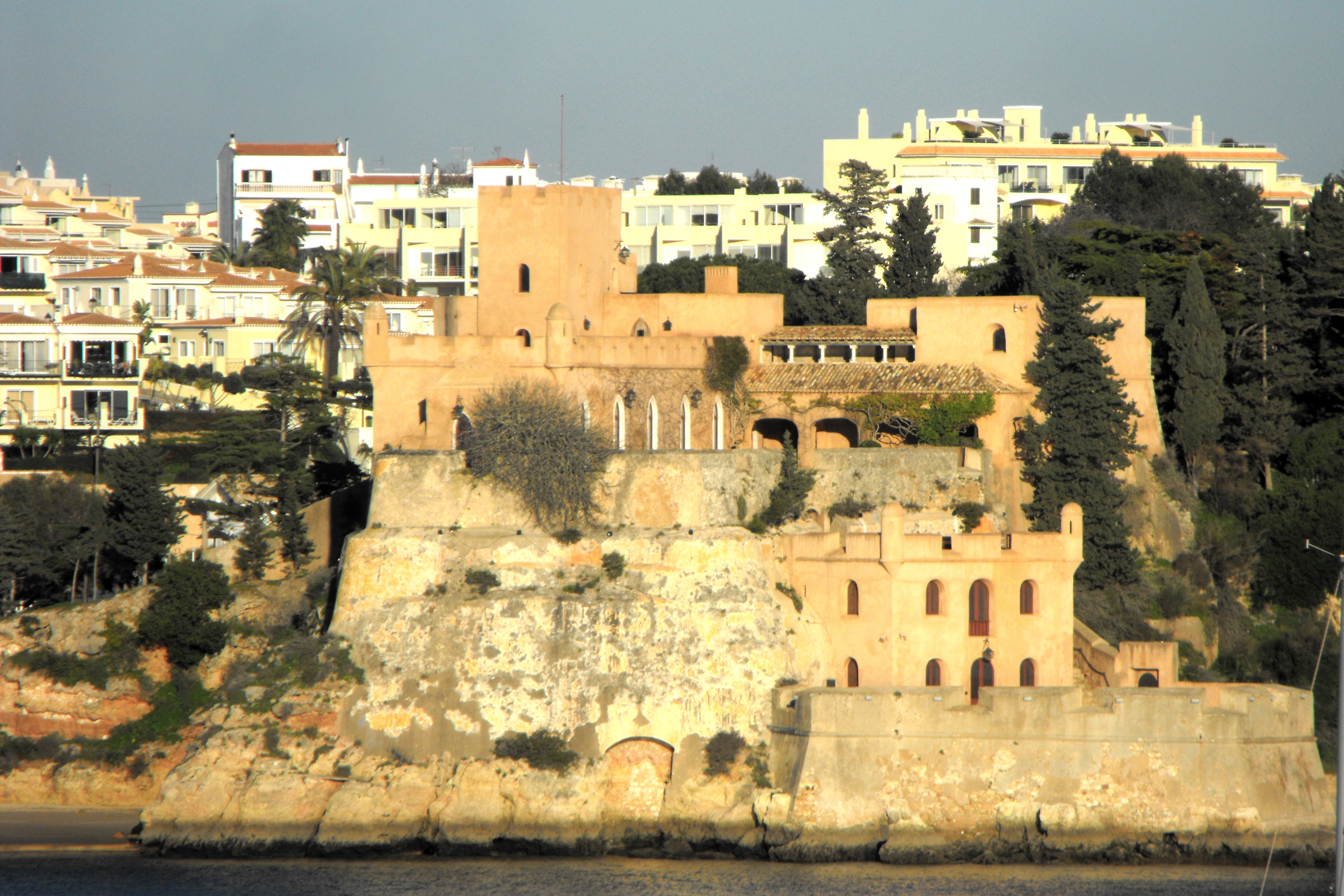
The front facade of the tiered castle of Arade, as seen from Portimão

Its location belies its status as a rural fortification, located on a hillock, overlooking the left margin of the Portimão estuary, isolated on a vast wooded property. Situated in a dominant position at the mouth of the Arade River, the elevated site divides two beaches: the Praia da Angrinha and the Praia Grande. Together with the Fort of Santa Catarina, on the water front of Portimão, the fort guards the estuary and mouth of the river.

The plan of the fort is an irregular trapezoid, implanted on a high spot, with a keep and various spaces oriented to the sea. The vertical facades are covered with windows and barbicans.

The structure of the fort is easily identifiable, with its battlements serving as positioning batteries. It was designed vertically, in order to permit visibility both from its battlements, and from sea. Its height, makes it one of the more interesting features of the structure, permitting observation.

The site is well preserved, with a large walled garden stretching from Praia da Angrinha to Praia Grande, that includes a large residence.
