= Fort of Santa Catarina (Portimão) =

- Forte de Santa Catarina
- Faro, Algarve, Algarve in Portugal
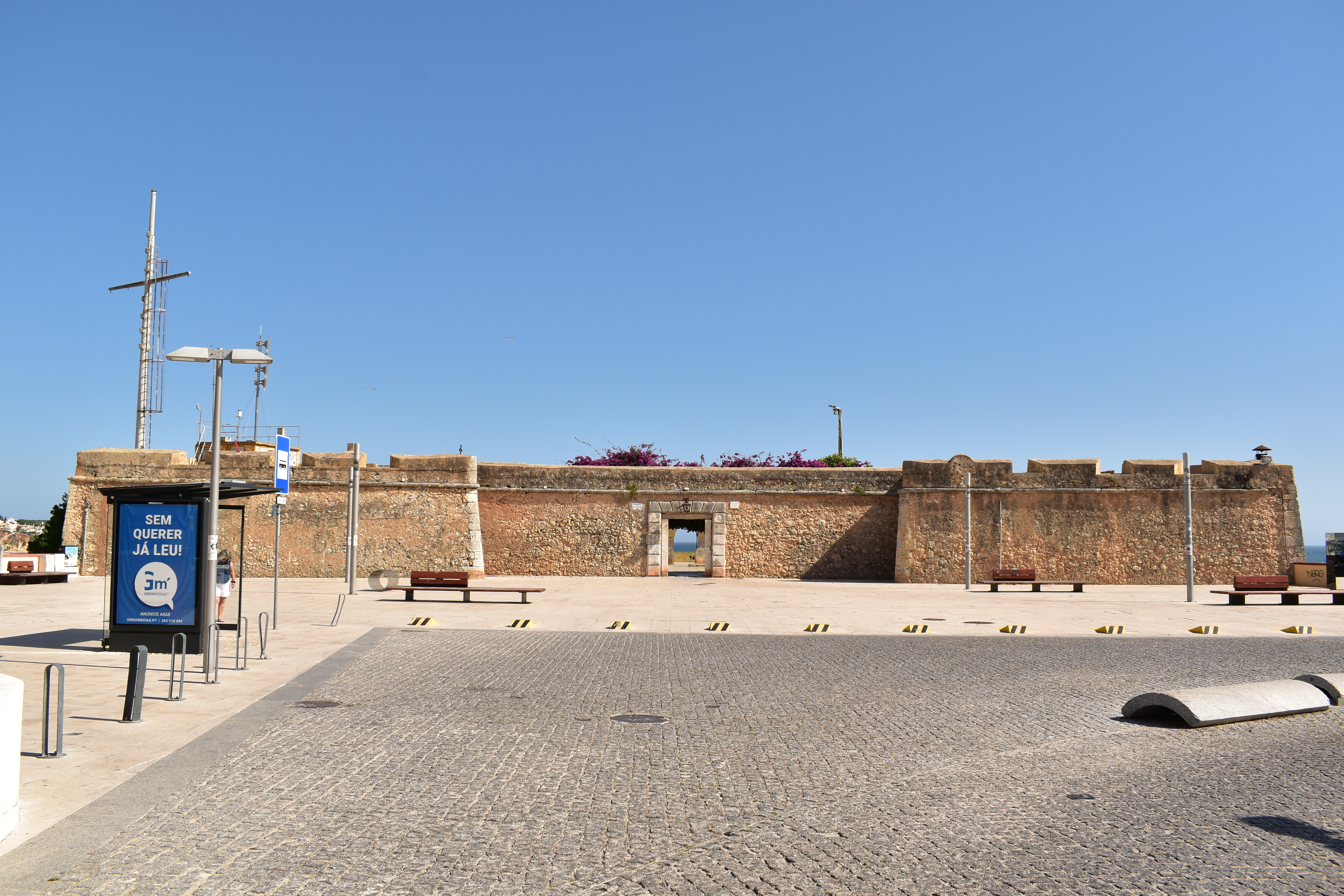
- Front view of Santa Catarina's fort, in 2020.

Site information
- Type: Fort
- Owner: Portuguese Republic
- Operator: Comissão Municipal de Turismo de Portimão; General-Command of Guarda Fiscal (ceded on 14 February 1948)
- Open to the public: Public

Location
- Coordinates: 37°6′58.82″N 8°31′46.54″W

Site history
- Built: c. 1621
- Materials: Stone, Masonry, Wood, Tile

The Fort of Santa Catarina (also known as the Fort of Santa Catarina de Ribamar) is a medieval fort situated in the civil parish of Portimão, in the municipality of Portimão in Portuguese Algarve. The structure was considered one of the last Philippine military projects in the Algarve, erected to defend the peninsula from pirates and privateers, as well as military invasions. Its construction is one of the better examples that work of Alexandre Massai, a military engineer who toured the Algarve (between 1617 and 1621) to reinforce numerous military fortifications along the coast.

== History ==
The origins of the Fort of Santa Catarina are still debated. Some authors point to a 15th-century origin, during the reign of King John III or Sebastian, although few proofs have been identified, except for a small chapel dedicated to Catherine of Alexandria.

In 1621, during the Iberian Union, Alexandre Massai, leading a committee of hundreds of specialists traveled the mouth of the Arade River, in order to find the best site for the construction of a fortress to defend the lands along the southern extent of the River. At the time many of the older medieval castles of Ferragudo and Portimão were already unable to support the defense of the coast to these limits, from pirates, corsairs and maritime invasions. The obvious choice at the time was along the edge of Praia da Rocha (referred to as Ponta de Santa Catarina) where a hermitage had once existed (and had been integrated in to a new fort) along the southern extent of Portimão's territory.

Various arguments have been suggested for this location, to the detriment of a proposed fortress sited further into the interior (likely in Ferragudo): the site offered better sight-lines, a greater access to potable water, and especially its privileged connection with Portimão, thereby determining its selection over other sites.

In 1621, Massai designed three proposed plans for the fortifications, all of which included an ample northern facade to serve as the principal entrance-way to the structure. The construction of the fortification began eight years later, in 1629, and was terminated in 1633 (relatively rapid for the time). Unfortunately, many of these elements were lost in successive years, owing to the alterations in design and function at the fort. Of the original 17th-century project, only the front facade, organized around three symmetrical walls, with the central/main entrance recessed. This front facade is constructed of large pilasters and lintel made from large blocks of round rock, conferring on a monumental structure, while the rest of the structure, in contrast, is relatively less grand. Also part of the project was a raised bridge, whose elements today no longer exist.

The 1755 Lisbon earthquake damaged the fortress, with the public works to reconstruct the structure divided into a period immediately after the event (essential repairs), while the remainder was carried out in the 1790s.

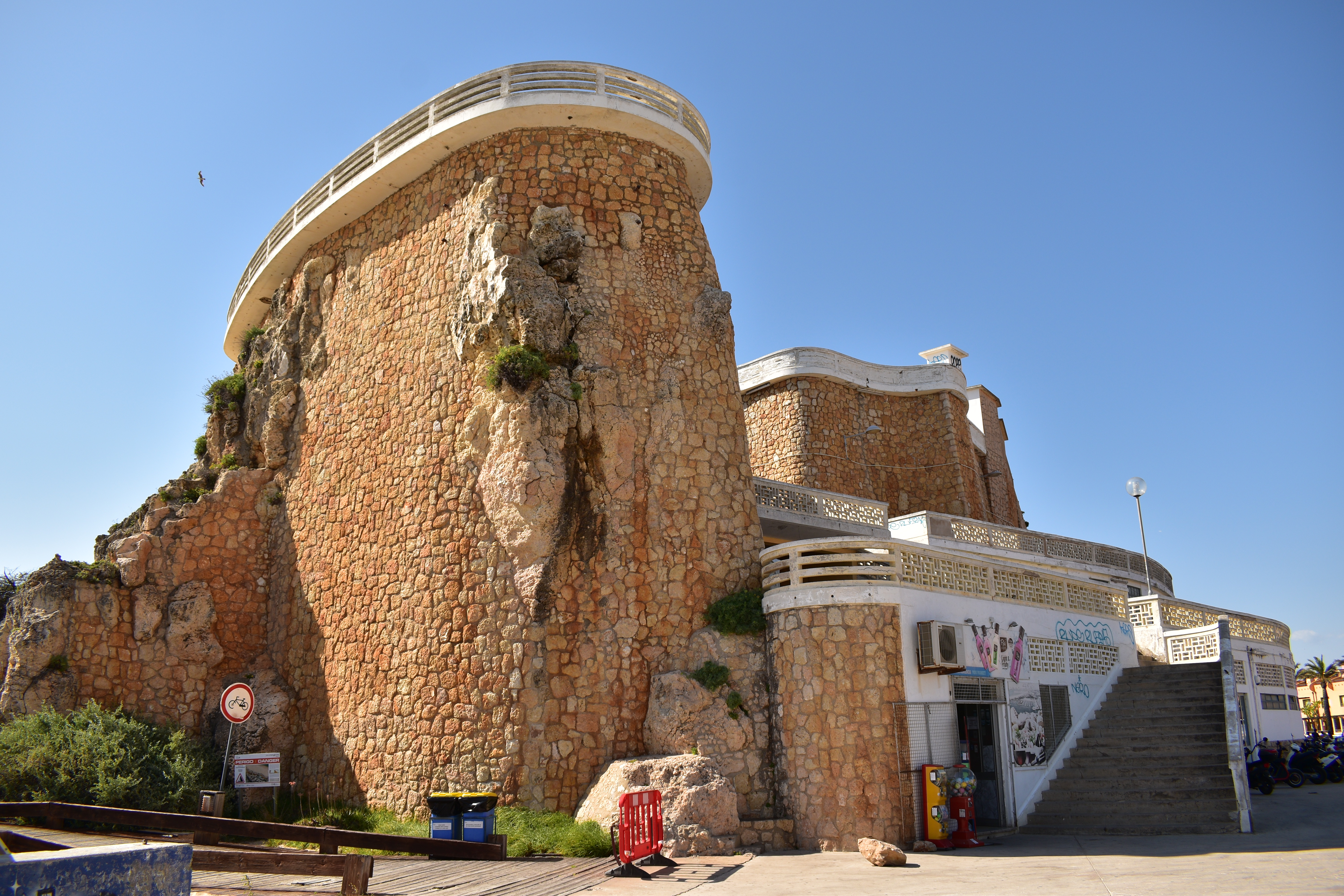
Fort of Santa Catarina from below

A profound remodeling of the space was accomplished during the 20th century, influenced by the development of tourism in the region; on 23 July 1946, a dispatch handed the property over to the Municipal Commission for Tourism of Portimão (Comissão Municipal de Turismo de Portimão). The interior was divided into a post for the Guarda Fiscal and Captaincy of Portimão (who partnered in the construction of the new buildings), as well as a space for a lookout. This last project occurred in the 1960s, and occupied a zone originally part of the battery, facing the sea in the extreme southeast corner of the building. During these projects the walls and base of the fortress were reinforced using modern techniques, which permitted the expansion of the area devoted to the lookout. In parallel, the progressive expansion of the beach meant that the fort could be used to support Praia da Rocha, including a restaurant and esplanade.

In 1969 an earthquake provoked damages and repairs to the building; in addition to the construction of reinforced concrete lintels, the braces and pillars were consolidated, repairs were made to the wall panels, grouting of cracks and plaster reconstruction were completed and the roofing was repaired, while the doors and frames were all painted.

== Architecture ==
Situated in the urban context of Portimão, on the extreme eastern portion of the Praia da Rocha, it is accessible by a staircase implanted into the cliffs. This fort defended the local settlements and the estuary of the Arade River, in conjunction with the Fort of São João do Arade on the opposite bank of the river in Ferragudo.

The fort is a trapezoidal plan, with the main gate oriented towards land, between battlements separated by ramps. The interior dependencies have been adapted into cafetaria and lookout; these spaces are single-height buildings consisting of rectangular spaces with doors, windows and tiled roofs with chimneys. A wall that is opened by seven arches separates the interior spaces from the walled lookout over the beach. The curtain of walls provides access to the beach by the staircase.
