= New Portimão Bridge =

New Portimão Bridge Ponte Nova de Portimão
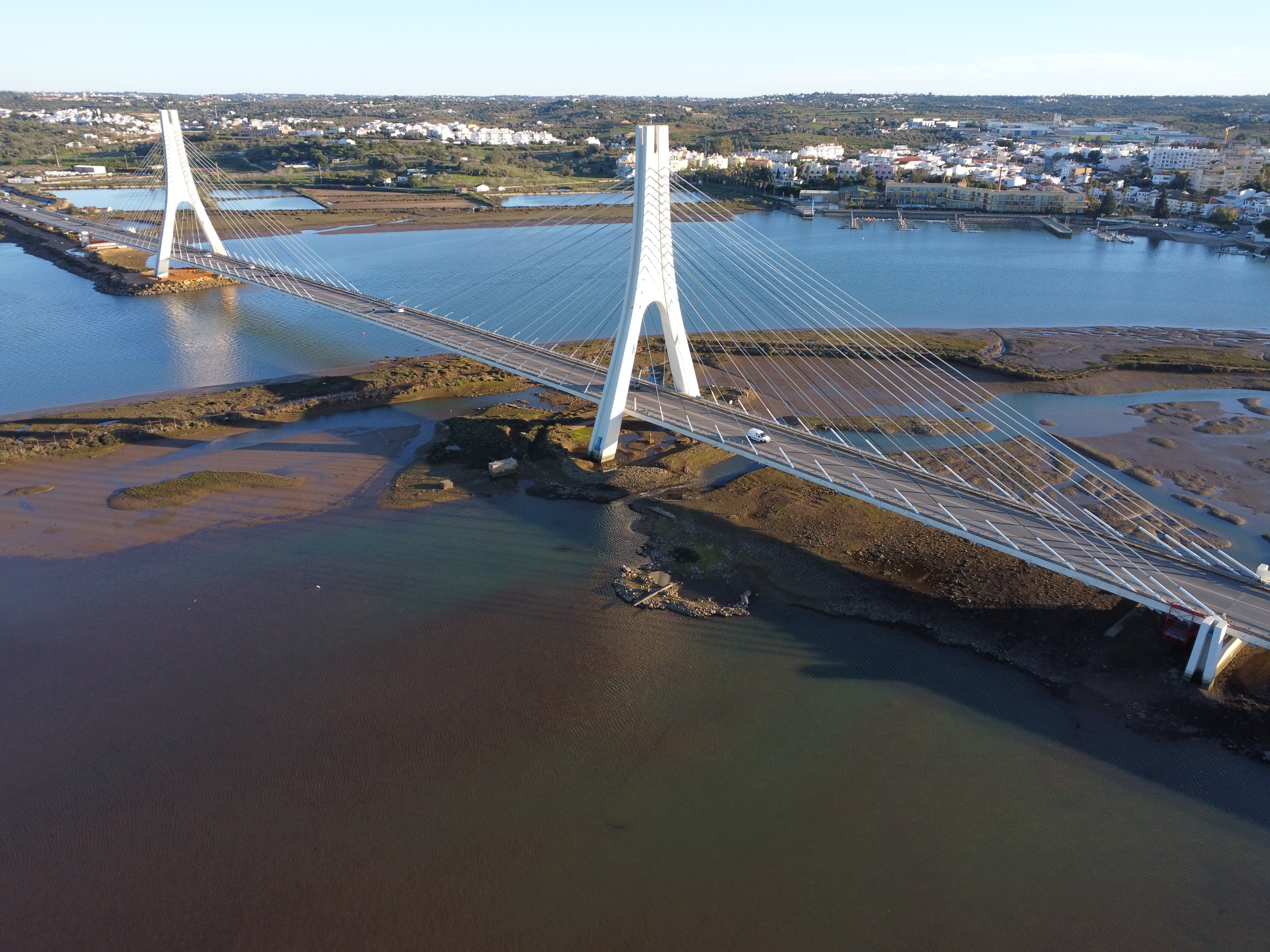
- Coordinates: 37°09′05″N 8°30′24″W
- Carries: EN 125
- Crosses: Arade River
- Locale: Portimão, Algarve, Portugal

Characteristics
- Design: Cable-stayed bridge
- Height: 12 m
- Longest span: 256 m

History
- Construction end: 1991

Location
- Interactive map of New Portimão Bridge

New Portimão Bridge (Portuguese: Ponte Nova de Portimão), also known as Ponte Nova do Arade, is a bridge that spans the Estrada Nacional 125 highway and the Rio Arade, near the city of Portimão, in the region of Algarve, in Portugal.

== Description ==
The bridge is a cable-stayed bridge, featuring a prestressed reinforced concrete deck with two 1.6 m high girders, and has a main span of approximately 256 m.

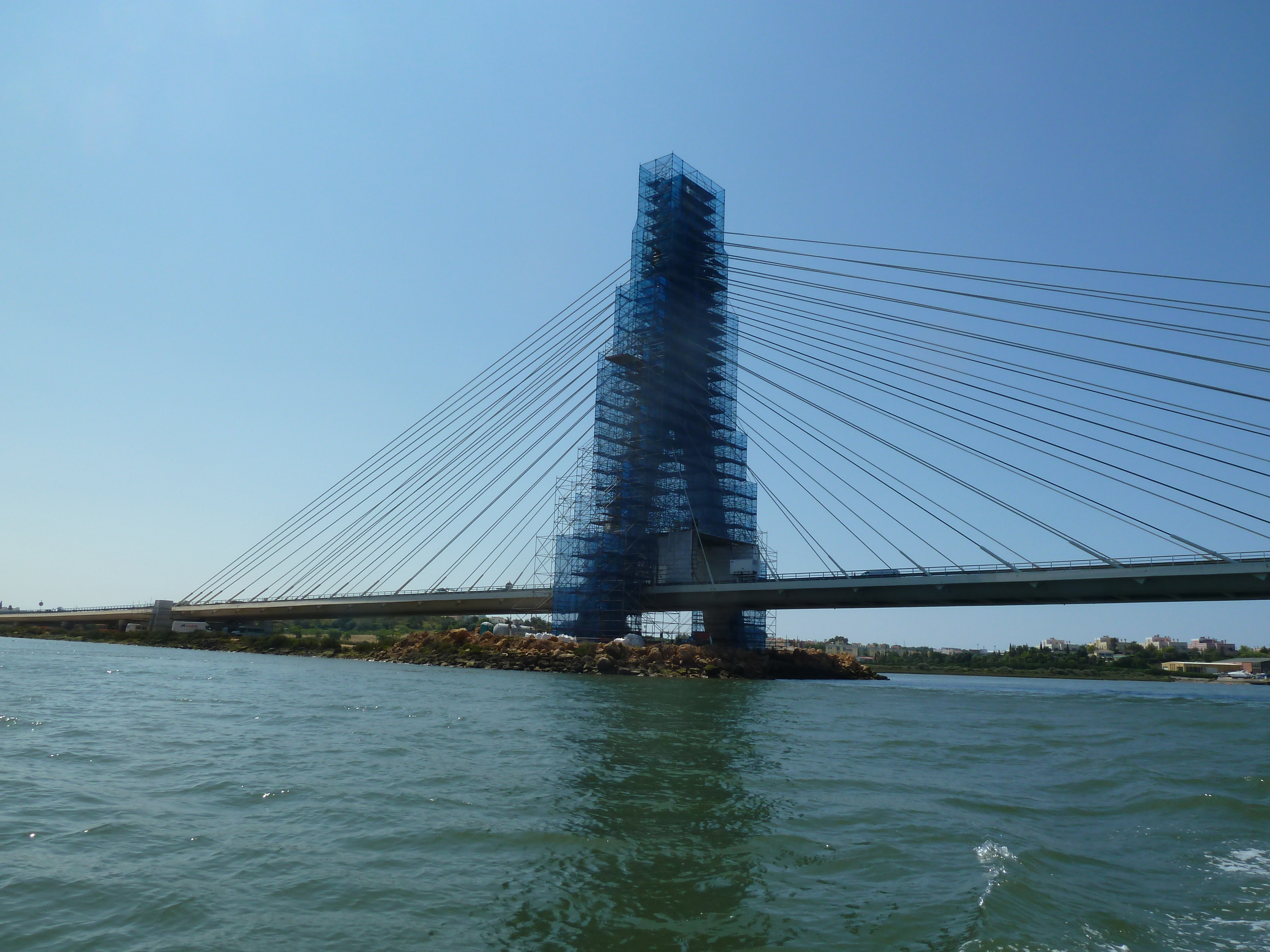
Restoration work on one of the towers in 2016

== History ==
The new bridge was completed in 1991. In 2007, the old bridge was temporarily closed for maintenance work, so the Ponte Nova (New Bridge) became the only road access between the municipalities of Portimão and Lagoa.

In 2008, the Ponte Nova de Portimão (New Bridge of Portimão) was one of the bridges depicted in the "Bridges and Works of Art" stamp series, launched by the company CTT Correios de Portugal.

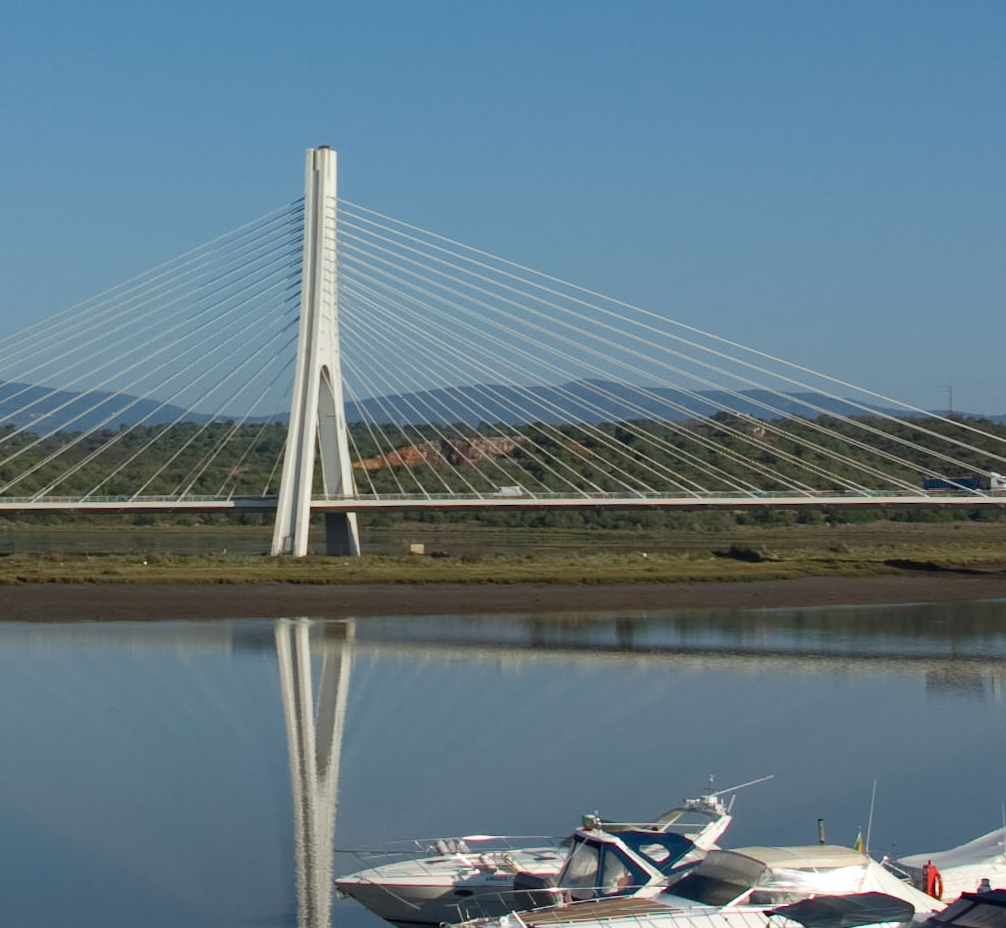
Detail of the bridge in 2008.
