= Praia Grande (Ferragudo) =

Beach in Lagoa, Portugal

Big Beach
- Beach
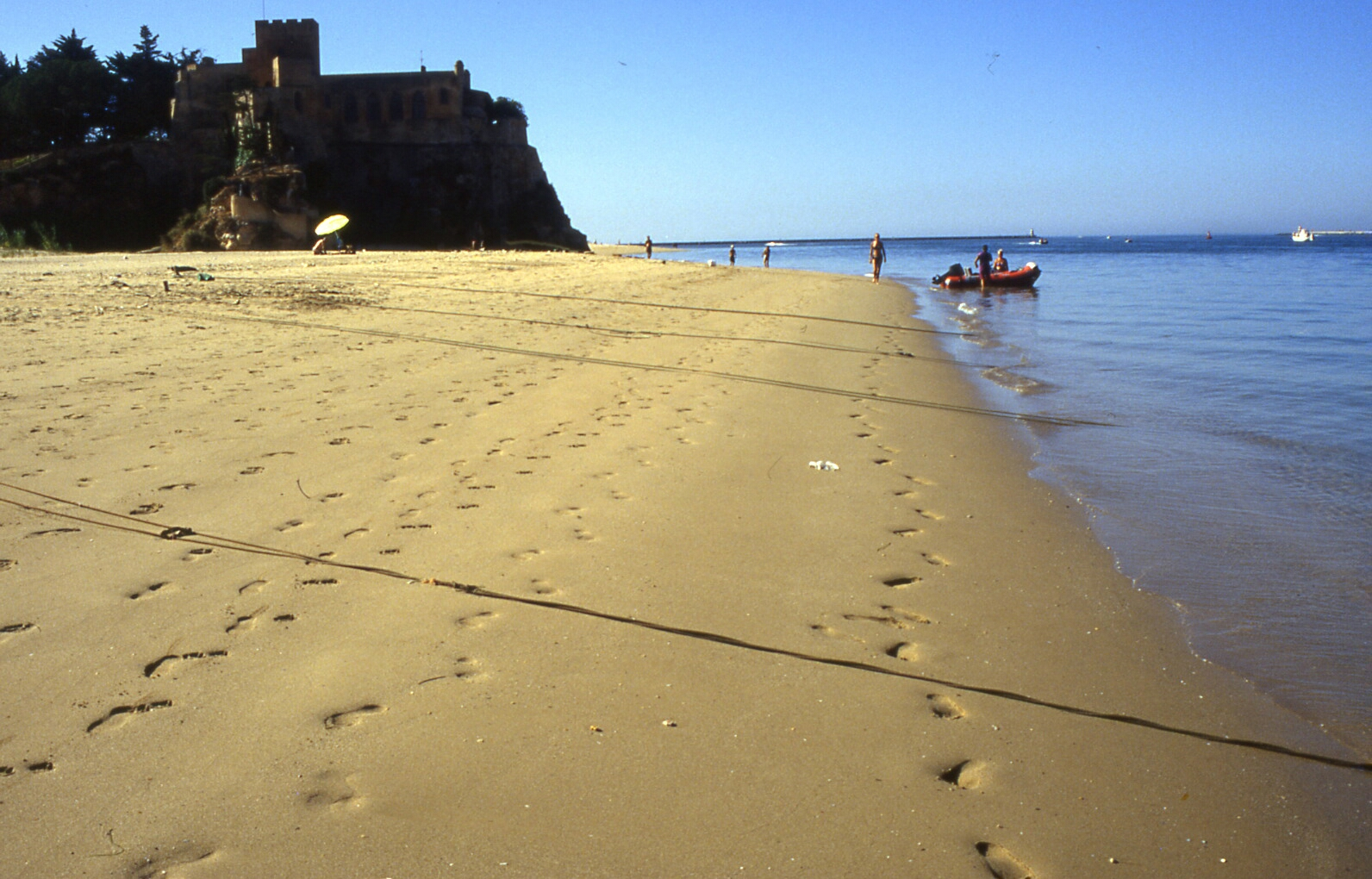
- A view of the golden sand of Praia Grande near the Fort of São João do Arade

- Location within Portugal
- Coordinates: 37°7′12″N 8°31′20″W
- Location: Lagoa, Algarve, Portugal

Praia Grande (Big Beach) is a beach situated in the civil parish of Ferragudo, municipality of Lagoa, the Portuguese Algarve.

One of many beaches to obtain the name Praia Grande, this coastal zone is located on the eastern back of Rio Arade estuary, south of the town of Ferragudo. It is just inside the mole that shields the river entrance and the port area of Portimão, and runs north to the Forte de Sao João do Arade. The crescent-shaped 627 metres (2,057 ft)-long beach extends from the accessway, at the end of Rua Doutor Coelho de Carvalho southeast to the cliffs, with a smaller beach extending 163 metres (535 ft) north to the summit of the fort, separated by boulders.

Like other beaches in the western Algarve, it is bordered by cliffs from the Miocene epoch, that are rich in marine fossils.

With median temperatures between 20–22 °C (68–72 °F), its protected location within the mole permits swimming/wading, windsurfing, bodyboarding and sailing.

The municipal authority services the beach with outdoor parking, security/surveillance, changing areas and showers, while commercial services include bar/restaurants, sunshade rentals and small craft hire.
