= Ferragudo =

- Civil parish
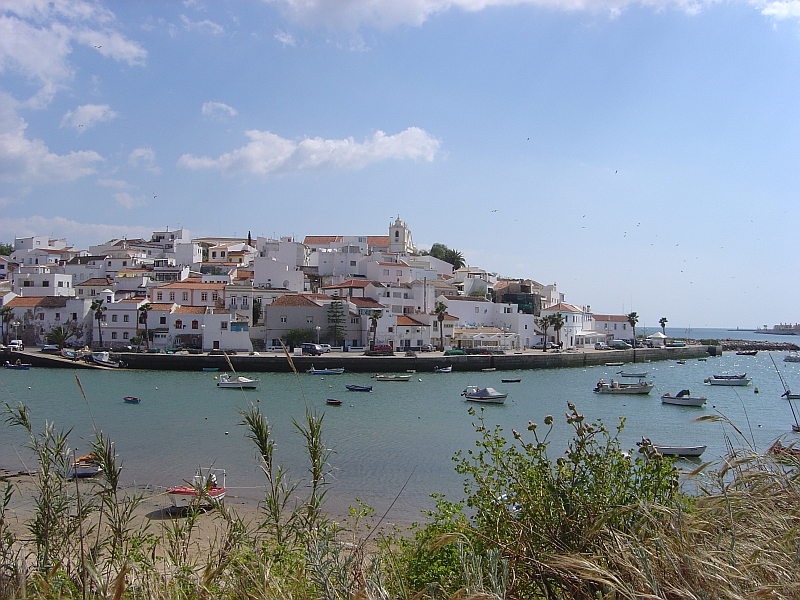
- The centre of Ferragudo, seen from across the Arade River

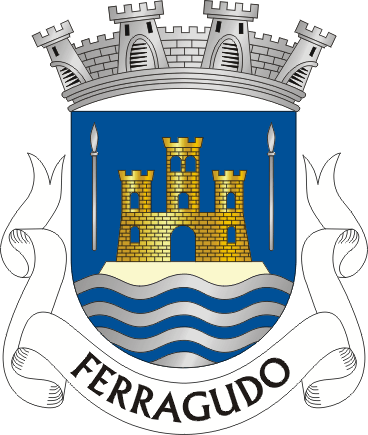
- Coat of arms

- Location in Portugal
- Coordinates: 37.124°N 8.521°W
- Country: Portugal
- Region: Algarve
- Intermunic. comm.: Algarve
- District: Faro
- Municipality: Lagoa

Area
  - Total: 5.41 km^{2} (2.09 sq mi)

Population (2011)
  - Total: 1,973
  - Density: 365/km^{2} (945/sq mi)
- Time zone: UTC+00:00 (WET)
  - Summer (DST): UTC+01:00 (WEST)
- Patron: Nossa Senhora da Conceição
- Website: http://www.f-ferragudo.pt/

Ferragudo is a Portuguese civil parish at the western border of the municipality of Lagoa. The population in 2011 was 1,973, in an area of 5.41 km^{2}. Ferragudo serves mainly as a bedroom community for its much larger neighbour, the city of Portimão; its residents routinely travel across the Arade River to work in the neighboring municipality.

== History ==
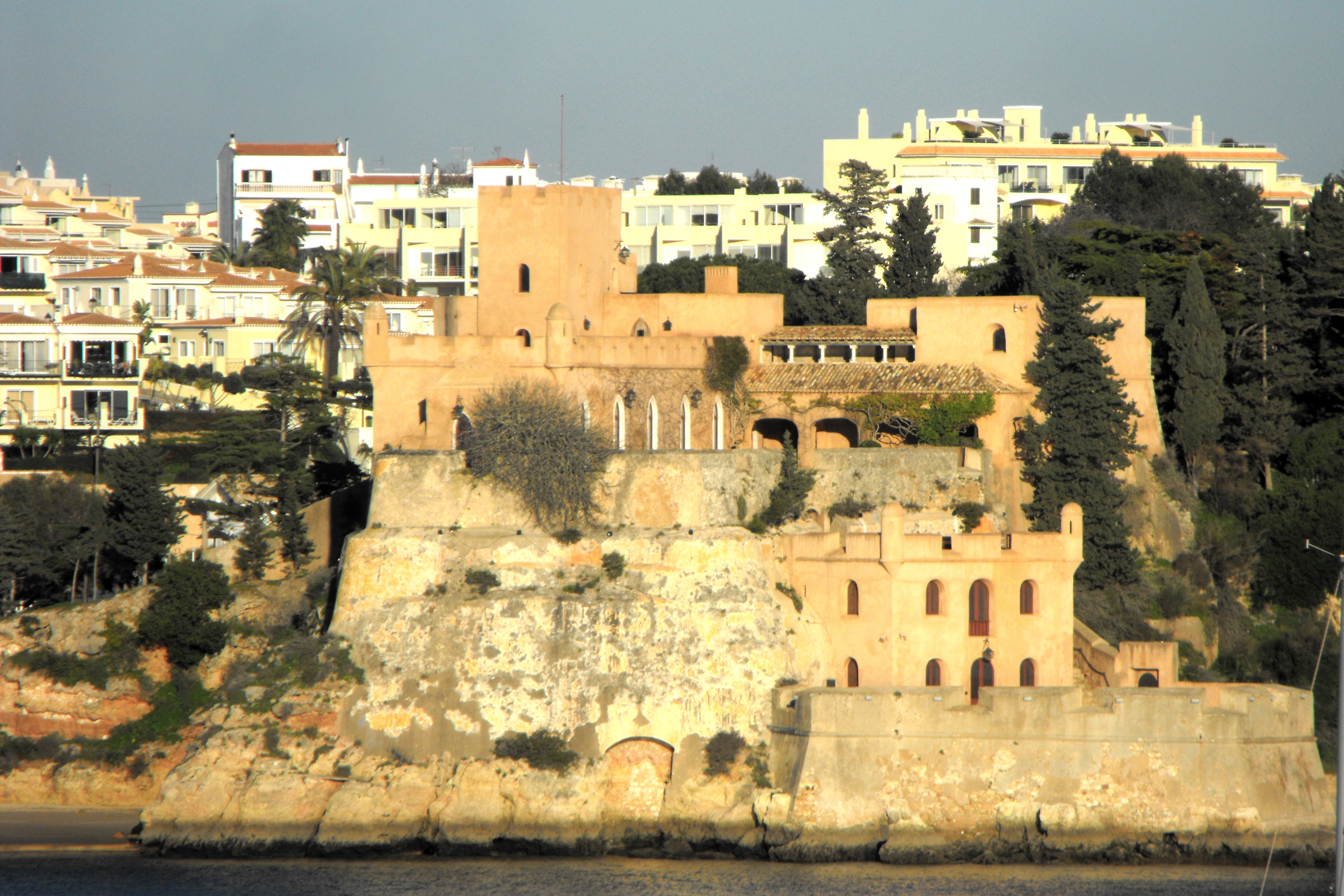
The Fort of São João do Arade, constructed in the 16th–17th century to protect the coast from pirates and privateers

There have been various explanations for the community's name: from the inheritance of Ferragudo in Castro Verde, the fort of Ferragudo in Vila Viçosa, the Spanishman Johane Anes Ferro Agudo de Espanha or the locality of Ferragudo. The most plausible explanation is the traditional one, probably from the 14th century, which suggested the existence of an iron machine that existed on the beach of Angrinha, and which was used to raise fish for market. This iron machinery or "engenho de ferro", which was relatively "pointy" or "agudo" evolved into "ferro agudo" or Ferragudo.

Ferragudo was known to the Phoenicians, Carthaginians and Romans, who were attracted to the mouth of the Arade River for its shelter and access to the Atlantic Ocean. In the 14th century, fishermen began to settle in the region, primarily to avoid the winter storms that afflicted the Atlantic coast. In 1520, Queen Leonor, noting the potential of area, secured its protection and thereby allowed continued occupation of the territory. The privileges conceded to the region mimicked those extended to Silves and its inhabitants. Consequently, the Bishop of the Algarve began to reside in the area. Similarly, the Bishop of Silves, D. Fernando Coutinho erected a wall to protect the population, at the same time ordering the construction of the local castle; he remained in the area until his death.

In the 18th century, the local economy evolved, based on fishing and agriculture inland, secure in the support of the monarchy, which resulted in a growth of population. This change led to the de-annexation of the territory of Ferragudo from Estômbar in 1749. For a long time the territory of Ferragudo was shared between its neighbouring parishes of Lagoa and of Estômbar after it was separated from the municipality of Silves on 26 January 1773.

The continued growth of the canning industry allowed Ferragudo to prosper. Until the late 20th century, Ferragudo was a fishing community that depended on seasonal employment along the Arade River or in the Atlantic Ocean and the estuary of the Arade River and the river itself. With the collapse of the fishing industry along the southern coast, the civil parish began to move to a tertiary economic model, concentrating on attracting tourism into the region. On 3 May 1999, the village was elevated to the civil status of town, absorbing the villages and hamlets of Aldeia de São Francisco, Vale de Azinhaga, Corgos, Gramacho, Presa de Moura and Vale de Lapa.

== Geography ==
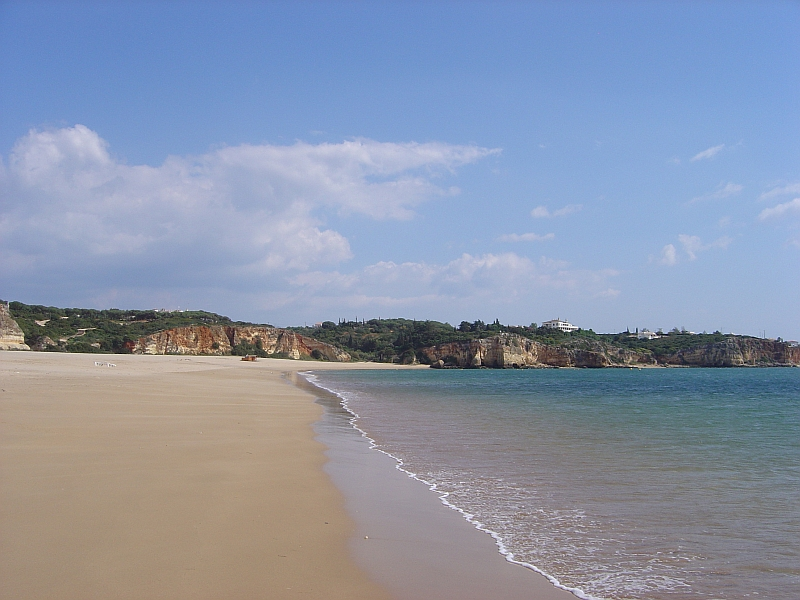
The Praia Grande beach, showing the expansive white sands that make the area popular with locals and tourists

The civil parish is bordered on the west and south by Arade River and the Atlantic Ocean, and its landscapes are coloured by the fishing economy and tourist beaches, such as Angrinha, Caneiros, Torrados, Infanta, Afurada, João Lopes, Molhe, Pintadinho and Praia Grande. It is situated between the parish of Parchal (in the north), Estômbar (in the east) and the municipality of Portimão (in the west, across the Arade River). The population is concentrated along the E.N.539 motorway and Atlantic coast, separated into two principal localities: Ferragudo and Vale de Azinhaga.

Among the natural scenic sites is the Ponta do Altar as well as various cliffs, caverns, vent chimneys and steep cliffed islets.

== Economy ==
For a long time the population of Ferragudo was connect with the fishery, suffering the ups and downs associated with this seasonal shifts. Meanwhile agriculture and the raising of cattle herds (dairy and meat) was always present within the territory (also influenced by the changes in the business cycles), while the cultivation of almonds, figs and carob predominated. Ferragudo, which in the past was the centre of a cattle fair, has traditionally been the location of several fish canneries. While this has been all but abandoned, in part due to the growth of tourism, there are still many fishermen who sail from the ports of the region.

== Architecture ==
=== Civic ===
- Fishing village/shacks (Portuguese: Bairro de Casas para Pescadores em Ferragudo)
- Lifeguard station of Ferragudo (Portuguese: Estação de Salva-Vidas de Ferragudo)
- Ponta do Altar Lighthouse (Portuguese: Farol da Ponta do Altar)

=== Military ===
- Atalaia da Ponta do Altar
- Fort of São João do Arade (Portuguese: Castelo de São João de Arade/Forte de São João do Arade); built from a foundation of a medieval redoubt, the fort was constructed after the Restoration Wars to protect the parish from pirates and privateers, using a multi-tier battlement system that had the potential of crossing the river mouth, towards Portimão;

=== Religious ===
- Church of Nossa Senhora da Conceição (Portuguese: Igreja de Nossa Senhora da Conceição)
