= Portimão (parish) =

- Civil parish
- Location in Portugal
- Coordinates: 37.139°N 8.537°W
- Country: Portugal
- Region: Algarve
- Intermunic. comm.: Algarve
- District: Faro
- Municipality: Portimão

Area
  - Total: 75.66 km^{2} (29.21 sq mi)

Population (2011)
  - Total: 45,431
  - Density: 600.5/km^{2} (1,555/sq mi)
- Time zone: UTC+00:00 (WET)
  - Summer (DST): UTC+01:00 (WEST)
- Website: http://www.jf-portimao.pt/

Portimão is a freguesia (parish) in the municipality of Portimão (Algarve, Portugal). The population in 2011 was 45,431, in an area of 75.66 km².

== Main sites ==
- Colégio dos Jesuítas Convent
- Misericórdia Church
- Nossa Senhora da Conceição Church
- Santa Catarina Fort
- São Francisco Convent or Nossa Senhora da Esperança Convent
