= Arade River =

River of the Algarve, Portugal

Coordinates: 37.111°N 8.524°W

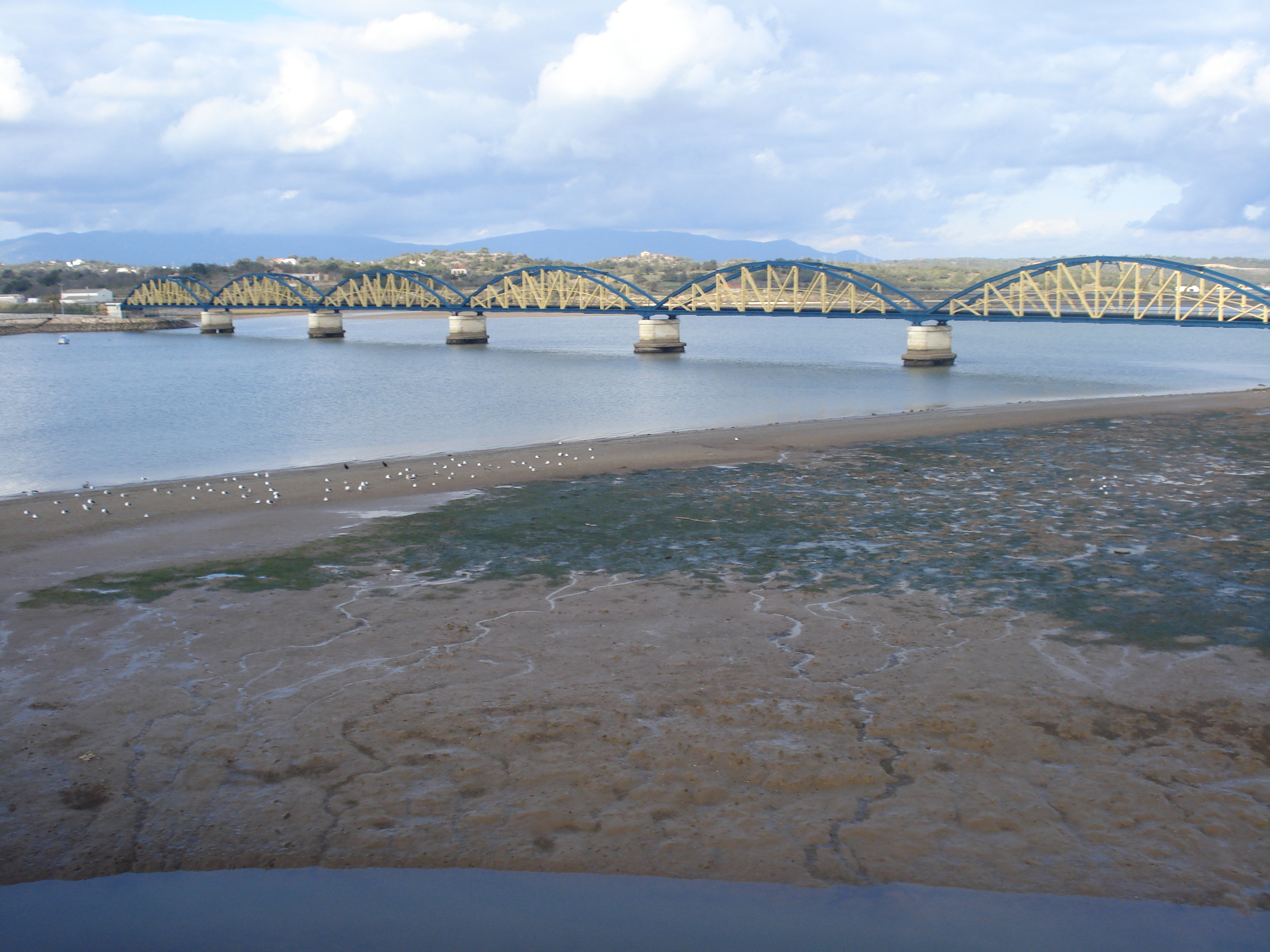
- Railway bridge over the Arade at Portimão

Location
- Country: Portugal
- Region: Algarve
- Municipality: Silves, Portimão

Physical characteristics
- Source: Serra do Malhão at the gully called Barranco do Pé do Coelho
- Mouth: Into the Atlantic Ocean at Portimão
- Length: 75 km (47 mi)

The Arade (Portuguese pronunciation: [ɐˈɾaðɨ]) is a river located in the region of the Algarve, southern Portugal. the river's course takes it through the municipalities of Silves, Lagoa and Portimão. The river remains navigable from the breakwaters at Portimao to the town of Silves. The source of the river lies to the southwest of the Serra do Caldeirão mountain ridge, in a valley called Barranco do Pé do Coelho. The river has a total length of 75.0 kilometres (46.6 mi), with its source being 481 metres (1,578 ft) above sea level. The mouth of the river empties into the Atlantic Ocean between the city of Portimão and the freguesia of Ferragudo, in Lagoa Municipality.

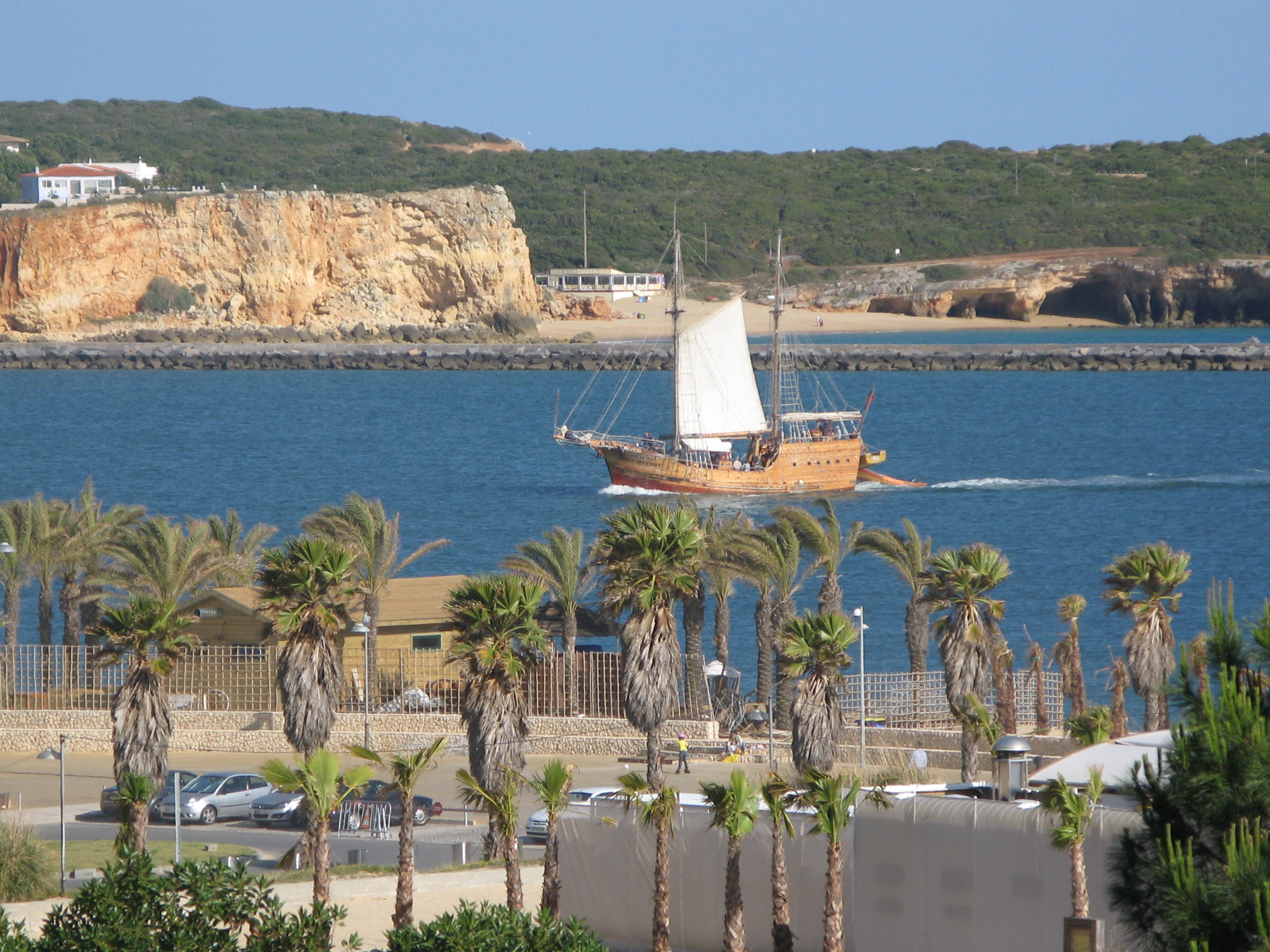
Mouth of the Arade from Portimão

From the middle-ages until the 19th century, the Arade was navigable up to as far as Silves about 12 kilometres (7.5 mi), where an important port used to exist, especially for the cork trade. Nowadays only small boats can go that far.

The etymology of the name is uncertain, although generally believed to be pre-Roman. It may be derived from a Celtic root, Arate. The term relates to water, and is attributed to the ancient Celtici people who settled in the region. Other theories point to a proto-Germanic or Indo-European root. Based in Middle-ages Latin sources from 1189 AD it was referred to as river Drade; and in 1266 AD as Oidaradi and Widradi, the river located near the settlement of 'Cilpes' (Silves), which is also pre-Roman.

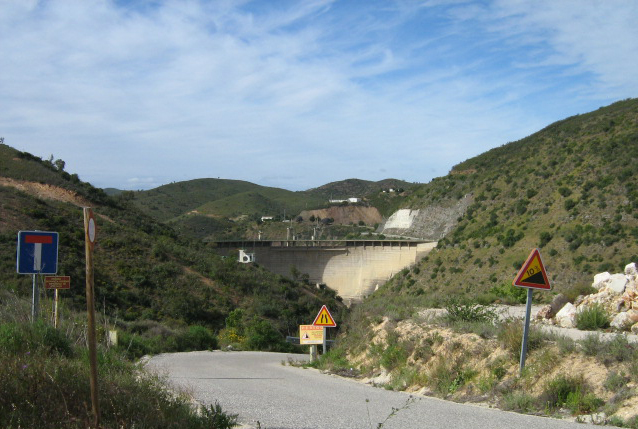
Barragem do Funcho

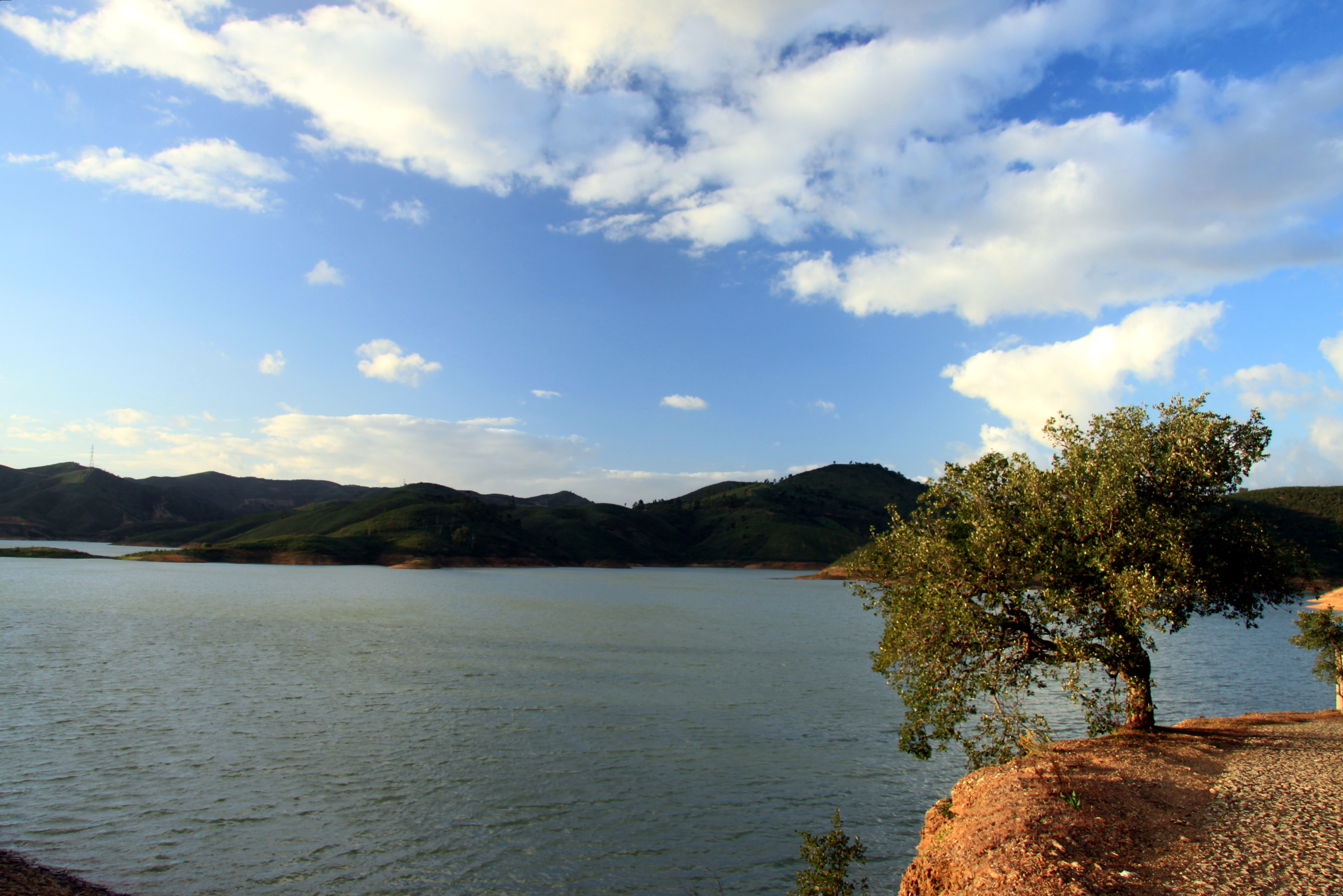
Barragem do Arade

== Dams ==
Part of the reason for the present low water flow (and subsequent silting up) of the river has been the erection of two dams in the middle reaches of the river—the Barragem (Dam) de Arade and above it the Barragem do Funcho.

On 23 May 2023 on a peninsula near the Arade Dam which is near Silves and is about 50 kilometres (31 mi) from where three year old Madeleine McCann was last seen in her bed at the Ocean Club in Praia da Luz on 3 May 2007 only days before her fourth birthday, Portuguese police along with German and British colleagues began a search of an area just over a 1 mile (1.6 km) long for possible evidence in the disappearance of Madeleine McCann. Previously, a child's sock was found in the search area in 2008. Hans Christian Wolters of the German prosecutors office in Braunschweig with support from the Federal Criminal Police Office (BKA) requested the May 2023 search which is being coordinated by the deputy director of Polícia Judiciária's Northern Directorate. Christian Brückner (also known simply as "Christian B" under German privacy laws) was living in a VW camper van near Praia da Luz when Madeleine disappeared. Began in 2011, Operation Grange is the code name of the case involving the disappearance of Madeleine McCann.
