= Praia Nova =

Portuguese beach

Coordinates: 37°05′46″N 8°23′18″W

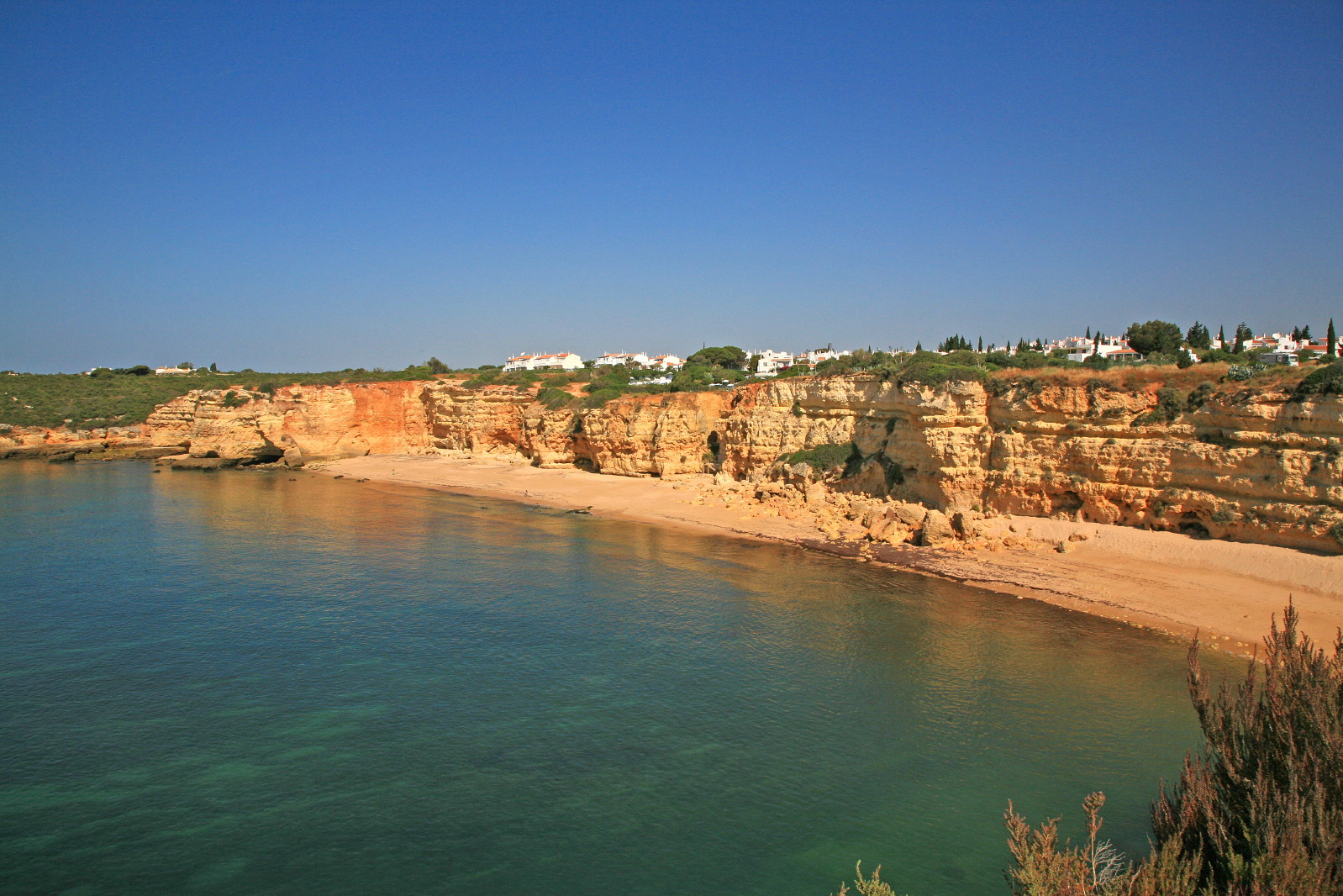
View of Praia Nova.

Praia Nova (New Beach) is a small beach near Praia da Senhora da Rocha on the Atlantic coast of the civil parish/freguesia of Porches in the municipality/concelho of Lagoa (Algarve) in Portugal.

The beach is flanked by cliffs. At the east end is a promontory on which is the old Fort and Shrine of Our Lady of the Rock. A tunnel has been excavated through this promontory to link Praia Nova with Praia de Nossa Senhora da Rocha on the other side.
