= Parchal =

- Civil parish
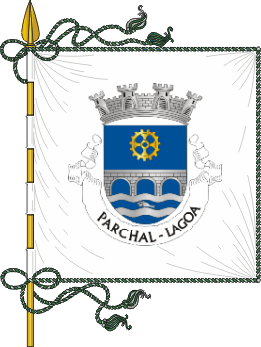
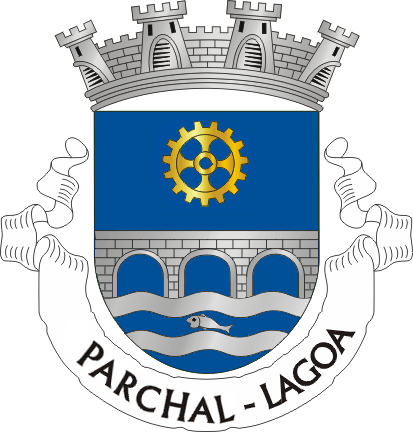
- Flag Coat of arms

- Location in Portugal
- Coordinates: 37°08′12″N 08°30′44″W
- Country: Portugal
- Region: Algarve
- Intermunic. comm.: Algarve
- District: Faro
- Municipality: Lagoa
- Disbanded: 2013

Area
  - Total: 3.86 km^{2} (1.49 sq mi)

Population (2011)
  - Total: 4,019
  - Density: 1,040/km^{2} (2,700/sq mi)
- Time zone: UTC+00:00 (WET)
  - Summer (DST): UTC+01:00 (WEST)
- Postal code: 8400
- Website: http://www.jf-parchal.pt

Parchal is a town and a former civil parish in the municipality (concelho) of Lagoa, Portugal. In 2013, the parish merged into the new parish Estômbar e Parchal. The population in 2011 was 4,019, in an area of 3.86 km^{2}. It is situated in the northwest part of the Lagoa Municipality.

Parchal serves mainly as a bedroom community for Portimão, and many of its residents travel daily across the Rio Arade to work in the neighboring municipality.

== History ==
Parchal, on the east bank of the Rio Arade, was separated from the freguesia of Estômbar on June 20, 1997. Its civil status was raised to that of a town on July 12, 2001.

The name “Parchal” appears to derive from “Parchel” or “Praxel”, the name of an old Franciscan monastery in the neighbouring village (to the east) of Calvário, in the freguesia of Estômbar. The word “praxel”, of Arabic origin, means a “flooded” or “marshy area”, just as occurred regularly in the area of Parchal in its early days, constantly invaded by the waters of the Rio Arade. Much earlier than its current designation, it was also known as “Aldeia dós Cucos,” a common reference to the Cuco family, one of the first to settle in Parchel.

Basic agriculture at first, and fishing and fish canning later, were the poles of attraction leading to the creation of the first nucleus of settlement across from Portimão, and linked to it by the railway bridge and the “old” road bridge at the turn of the twentieth century. A major fishing boat harbour was created on the Arade below the bridges, and at the height of the canning industry in the middle of twentieth century, a number of canneries established themselves in the area. By the time the canning industry began to decline in the 1970s, Parchal had already become a consolidated urban area which strong ties to Portimão, where many of Parchal’s inhabitants worked in fishing, commerce or service industries.

== Sub-areas ==
- Bela Vista
- Mexilhoeira da Carregação
- Pateiro

== Significant Sites ==
- Igreja de Parchal, also known as the “Igreja de São Francisco de Assis”
- Fishing Port
- Pavilhão do Arade

== Economic Activity ==
- Fishing
- Fish culture
- Gathering/sale of bivalves
- Civil construction
- Small industry
