= Parque Municipal das Fontes (Lagoa) =

Park in Algarve, Portugal

Coordinates: 37.162°N 8.486°W

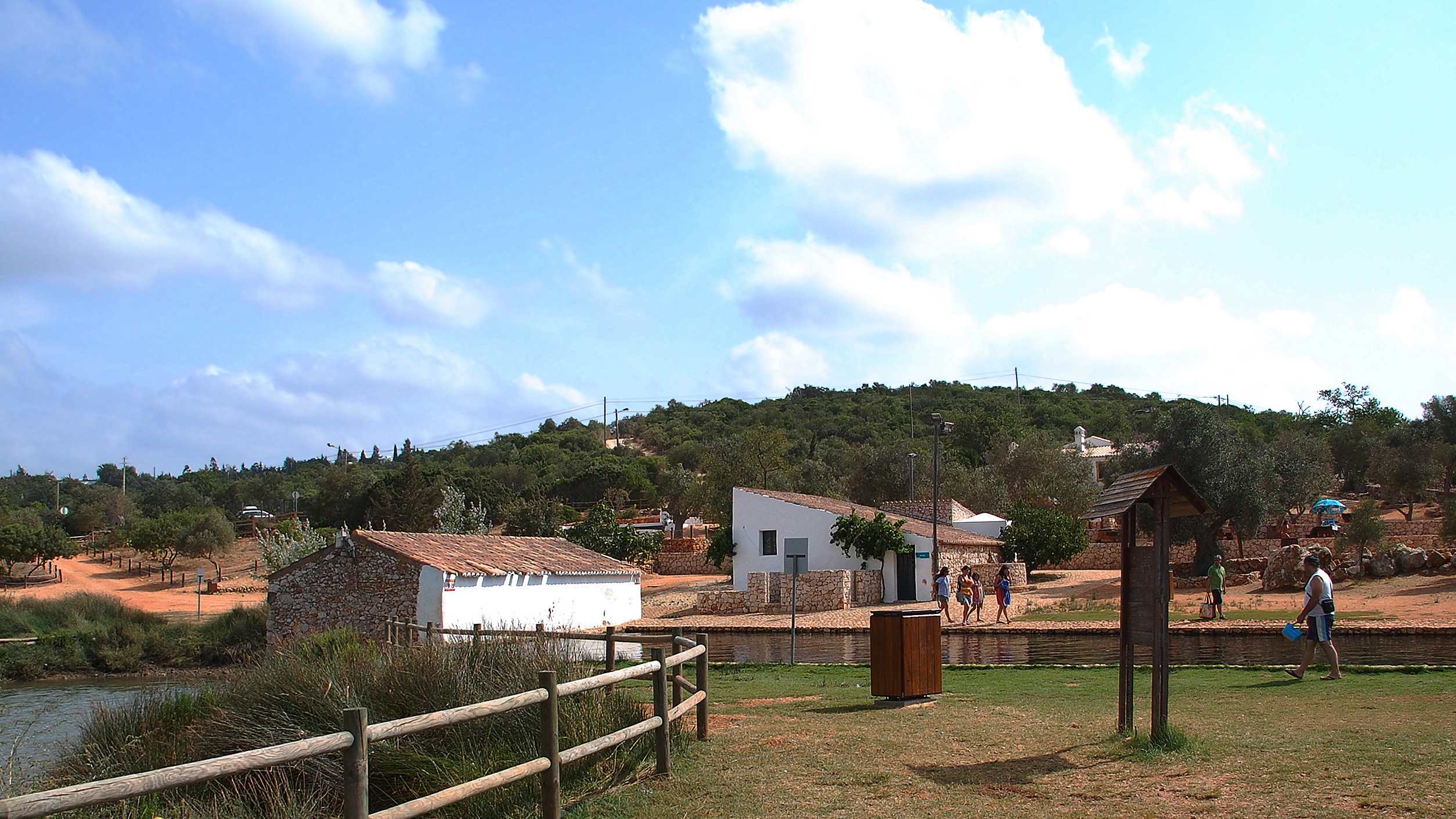
Sítio das Fontes

The Parque Municipal das Fontes (the Municipal Park of the Springs), or Fontes de Estômbar (The Estômbar Springs), is a park surrounding a major spring situated on the left bank of the estuary of the Arade River, north of the town of Estômbar, in Lagoa Municipality.

The park, formally created in 1989, consists of about de 18 ha (180.000 m2) and is an important ecosystem site reserved for those interested in nature. Use of the area began as a picnic site, overlooking the Arade River as it passes from Silves Municipality down to the Atlantic. The park now has a restored watermill, open for visits, a reconstructed Algarve house, an open-air amphitheater, and an area for physical fitness exercise.

The site is also historically and culturally important since vestiges of human activities dating back to pre-historic times have been found here. A watermill is documented in the "Livro do Almoxarifado de Silves" (15th century), which records an "... açenha das fontes em que fez Vicente Pirez huu moynho ..." (a "scene [= site] of springs where Vicente Pirez has a mill").

In more recent times the site has been used by the local population for recreational purposes, the commemoration of festivals, and for interaction with nature. As well the pools created by the springs are used for bathing.
