= Praia de Nossa Senhora da Rocha (Porches) =

Beach in Lagoa, Portugal

Coordinates: 37°05′46″N 8°23′18″W

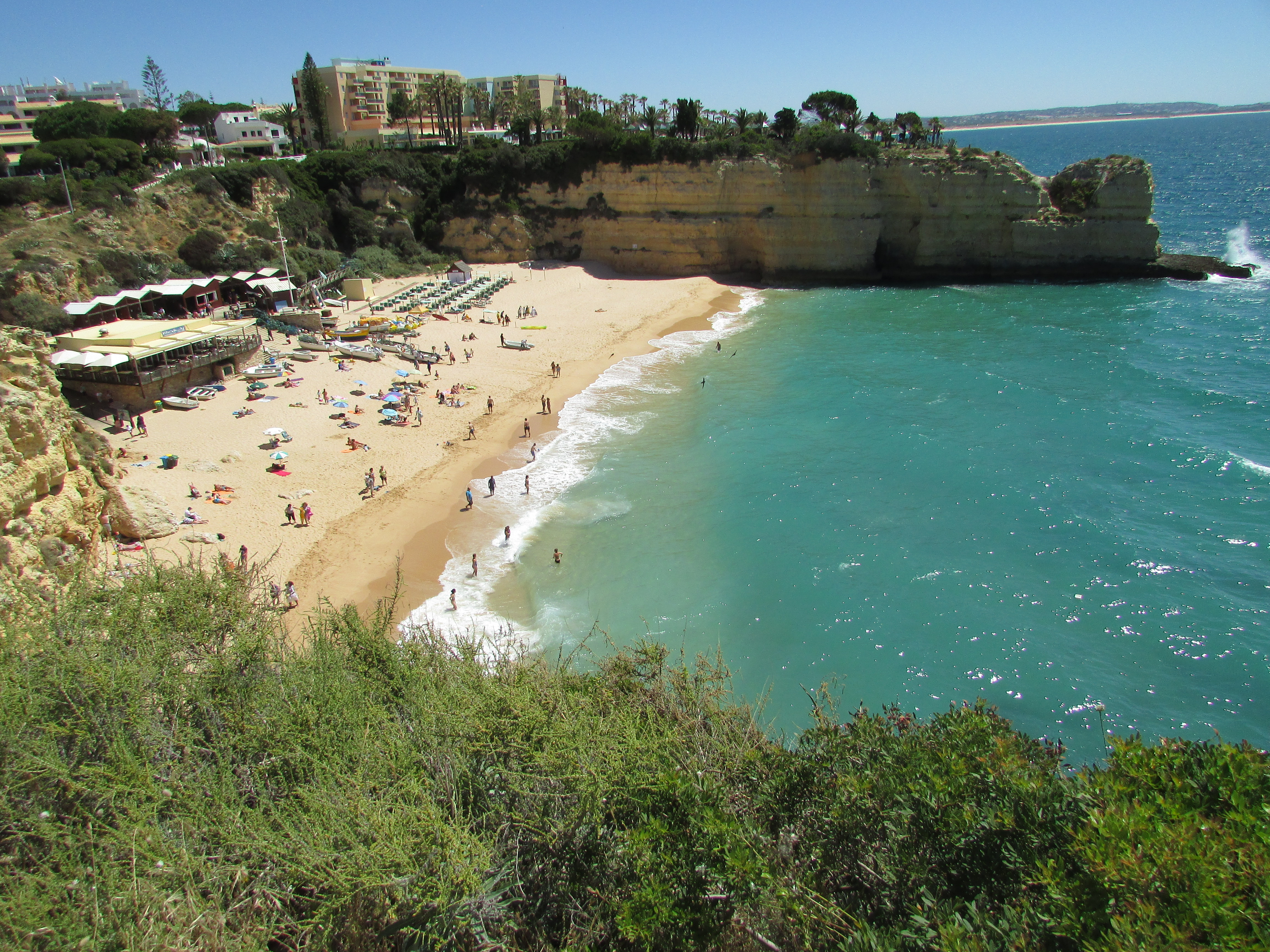
Praia de Nossa Senhora da Rocha.

Praia de Nossa Senhora da Rocha (in Portuguese: Beach of Our Lady of the Rock) is a small fishing community and beach on the Atlantic coast of the civil parish/freguesia of Porches in the municipality/concelho of Lagoa (Algarve) in Portugal. The beach is one of the most rustic ones along the coast and was used as a refuge for small fishing boats in the area.

The beach is flanked by cliffs. At the west end is a promontory on which is the old Fort and Shrine of Nossa Senhora da Rocha. A tunnel has been excavated through this promontory to link Praia da Senhora da Rocha with Praia Nova on the other side.

The fact that the beach/Praia da Senhora da Rocha is protected by cliffs is not only a great advantage for the fishermen, it also offers shelter to tourists when the wind is very strong.

The beach is surrounded by abundant greenery, including juniper and wild olive and mastic trees. Many plants typical of these saline environments can be seen growing on the cliff face, along with numerous birds that take shelter here: falcons, black-headed gulls, herring gulls and swifts.
