= Church of Our Lady of Light =

Church of Our Lady of Light may refer to:

- Church of Our Lady of Light, Chennai, India
- Church of Our Lady of Light (Lagoa), Portugal
- Church of Our Lady of Light (Lisbon), Portugal
- Loon Church, Nuestra Señora de la Luz Parish Church (also Our Lady of Light Parish Church), Bohol, Philippines
