= Rádio Lagoa =

- Lagoa, Algarve; Portugal
- Frequencies: 99.4 and 100.0 FM

Programming
- Language: Portuguese
- Format: Portuguese music

Ownership
- Owner: Lagoanima – Empresa Radiofónica e de Comunicação de Lagoa, Lda.

History
- First air date: June 2, 1975 (as a pirate; legalized 1989)
- Former names: RIA – Rádio Independente do Algarve; RTL – Rádio Lagoa; Rádio Voz do Mar

Links
- Website: https://www.radiolagoa.pt/

Rádio Lagoa is a local radio station in Lagoa, Algarve, in southern Portugal, broadcasting on 99.4 FM (from the main transmitter in Porches) and 100.0 FM (micro-coverage and signal boosting for Ferragudo and surrounding areas).

The main transmitter of Rádio Lagoa, located in Porches (99.4 FM), transmits with a power of 1,000W (1kW). This power allows the signal from the main transmitter to cover the Algarve region and reach some areas of the Lower Alentejo region. The second transmitter in Ferragudo (100.0 FM) functions as a micro-coverage station with reduced power, intended strictly to reinforce the local signal due to the orography of the area.

== History ==
The station's history dates back to June 2, 1975, shortly after the Carnation Revolution. It originally began broadcasting under the dead-of-night cover as a pirate radio station called RIA – Rádio Independente do Algarve. Its core mission was to be "turned toward the people; to serve, educate, and entertain them". By 1978, the broadcast range expanded beyond the then-village of Lagoa. Two transmitters were installed, one transmitting on Medium wave and the other on FM, which broadcast to the towns of Portimão, Silves, Armação de Pêra and Monchique. Despite repeated attempts to legalize the station, it remained clandestine. At one point, authorities confiscated the broadcasting equipment, but the station operators managed to return to the airwaves at irregular hours using a small, alternative transmitter.

Following a major restructuring period in the mid-1980s, the station permanently transitioned out of its pirate status and initiated its official legal broadcasts in 1989. In February 1986, it was renamed RTL – Rádio Lagoa.

In 1987, it emerged as one of the most listened-to local radio stations nationally. A study commissioned by the State Secretariat for Culture placed Rádio Lagoa on par with RDP, Rádio Comercial, with 22% of the audience.

On March 6, 1989, due to the legalization process, it was officially assigned an FM frequency and renamed Voz do Mar (Voice of the Sea). However, despite the new name, it continued to be better known as "Rádio Lagoa", a result of its local popularity and the considerable credit it earned thanks to its staunch defense of Portuguese music.

On November 20, 2023, the broadcasting licence renewal for Rádio Lagoa was officially approved by the Portuguese Media Regulatory Authority (ERC — Entidade Reguladora para a Comunicação Social).
