= Church of Saint James the Great (Estômbar) =

- Church of St. James
- Igreja de São Tiago Maior
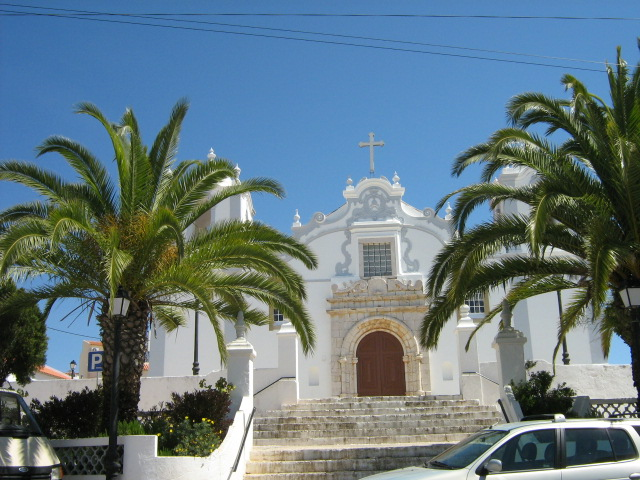
- The parochial church of Santiago/São Tiago Maior of Lagoa
- Church of Saint James the Great
- 37°8′48.01″N 8°29′17.84″W
- Location: Faro, Algarve, Algarve
- Country: Portugal

History
- Dedication: James, son of Zebedee

Architecture
- Style: Manueline, Mannerist, Baroque

Specifications
- Length: 31 m (102 ft)
- Width: 23 m (75 ft)

Administration
- Diocese: Roman Catholic Diocese of Faro

The Church of Saint James the Great (Portuguese: Igreja de São Tiago Maior) is the principal church, in the civil parish of Estômbar in the municipality of Lagoa in the Algarve. Situated in the heart of the town, the church was consecrated to the invocation of Saint James, son of Zebedee.

== History ==
The first substantial church was probably erected in Estômbar in the first half of the 16th century (while Lagoa was still part of the municipality/concelho of Silves). The style of the main door of the church and its affinity to similar buildings such as the principal churches of Alvor and of Odiáxere, and Santa Misericórdia Church of Silves suggests the existence of a regional sub-group of Manueline architecture in the Algarve. The popular prevailing style of the time is reflected in this church: a tripartite nave with a wooden ceiling, no transept, and altars at the head of the nave on each side of the chancel, as well as side chapels.

The first documented reference dates to 1719/1745, referring to the main altar and the collateral chapels.

The earlier church was badly damaged in the 1755 earthquake during which the bell tower collapsed. The Manueline doorway survived, as did the tiling in the chancel end. Reconstruction took a number of years since various of alterations were introduced, including the replacement of the original interior columns with cylindrical classical ones reflecting contemporary taste (a revival of the style of the second half of the sixteenth century) similar to what occurred in Lagoa and St. Peter (São Pedro) of Faro.

It is thought that, as in Lagoa, the Faro master carver Manuel Francisco Xavier, among others, played a part in the design and supervision of the reconstruction. We have a record of Xavier resigning his contract in 1769 because of the death of one of his partners. Eventually the work was finished in 1770, having cost the Building Commission (Comissão Fabriqueira) the sum of 630 milréis.

By 1965, the church was in a bad state, with the ceiling and doorways damaged, in addition to problems with water infiltration that damaged the interior and walls. An earthquake on 28 February 1969, caused further damage to the towers, vaulted ceiling over the altar, the triumphal archway and divisions between the naves.

The state of pavement in the churchyard was degraded in 1983.

== Architecture ==
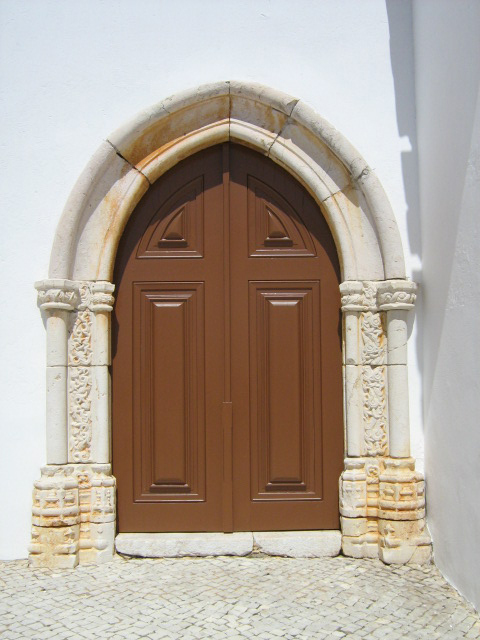
Main Door

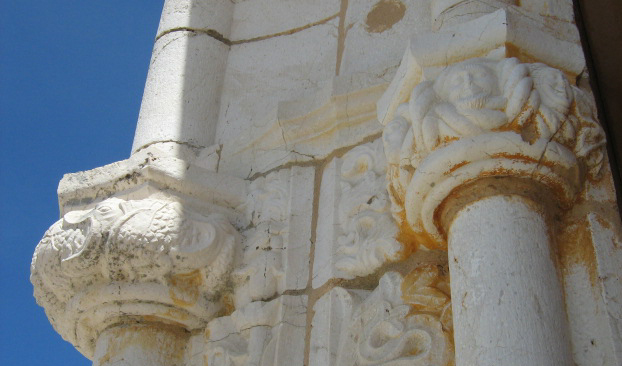
Door capitals

The 18th century was a period of great prosperity, and also of great artistic activity in Portugal. This period saw the refurbishing of all the chapels, which in many cases also involved the disappearance of the earlier decoration. Only some wooden carvings of the 16th and 17th centuries survived, appearing in the new altar pieces side by side with more recent carvings.

The three altars at the chancel-end of the church fit the Baroque style both in their decoration and in terms of the tile facings on the walls. The tiles covering the vaulted areas around each of the altars and the end wall of the nave above the chancel date to 1719 and reflect the popular national blue-on-white style of the period. One panel in the chancel represents St. James on a caravel fighting the Moors in the naval Battle of Lepanto (1571) in which Dom John of Austria defeated the Turks. The panel reflects the military and religious power of Christianity over Islam, an implicit message for the descendants of the Muslims still resident in the area and who still maintained certain Muslim traditions.

Since there appears to have been no major tile workshops in the Algarve at the time, recourse was made to Lisbon tile masters, and one hypothesis links these tiles to the workshop of Policarpo de Oliveira Bernardes.

The altarpiece which stands out most is that of the chancel, created by the Monchique master-carver Custódio de Mesquita under a 1709 contract. This piece is significant because it is the only known piece by this particular carver. Its stylistic links to other altarpieces in the Algarve suggests his participation in a Western Algarve “school”.

The predominant style of the second half of the 18th century was Rococo, and examples of this style appear in a few items rebuilt after the earthquake: the throne in the tribune of the altarpiece in the chancel (ca. 1760); the altarpiece of the chapel of Christ Crucified; and the arches of the two chapels along the Epistle side of the church.

=== Chapels ===
The Chapel of Christ Crucified (Capela do Senhor Jesus Crucificado) was constructed in 1589, according to a date on the front of the arch over it. In the same area are two Renaissance medallions showing the heads of St. Peter and St. Paul. The altarpiece dates from the third quarter of the 18th century, a good example of the Rococo style. The central area is filled by pictures of Our Lady of Sorrows and of St. John the Evangelist, and by the large sculpture of Christ Crucified. Although we do not know the creator of this piece, it appears to be by an Algarve artist, reflecting the technical and artistic mastery found elsewhere in the region.

The other side chapels are the Chapel of Saint Anthony (Santo António) and the Chapel of the Souls (das Almas).

=== Treasures ===
The church has a fine ivory crucifix from Portuguese India. After the arrival of Europeans, ivory carvings of western religion themes were produced in large numbers in the 17th and 18th centuries, mainly for the metropolitan market where they were installed in many private oratories of wealthier people. Some of these made their way to the Algarve and some of those came into the possession of various churches, often through pious donations. The crucifix in this church is 54 x 52 cm. Despite some damage to the fingers, it is a fine example of the 18th-century Indo-Portuguese imagination. Neither the donor nor the date of acquisition is known, other than it was part of the altarpiece of the chancel in the 19th century.

In the inside of the entrance doors are two Manueline columns, one on each side, on which are carved various figures framed in little niches. The long procession of figures probably alludes again to the supremacy of Christianity over Islam. One can pick out various musicians (with tambourines, bagpipes, violas, etc.), members of the regular and secular clergies, nobles, simple people, and slaves. These columns were only rediscovered in 1946; up to then they had been completely encased in thick layers of plaster and whitewash.
