= Craft, Tourism, Agricultural, Commercial and Industrial Fair of Lagoa =

The FATACIL (Portuguese: Feira de Artesanato, Turismo, Agricultura, Comércio e Indústria de Lagoa), the Craft, Tourism, Agricultural, Commercial and Industrial Fair of Lagoa, occurs annually (since 1980) for 10 days in August in the Parque de Feiras e Exposições (Fair and Exhibition Grounds) in the Algarvan city of Lagoa, Portugal. The special exhibition grounds were created between 1989 and 1992.

The fair is attended each year by thousands of visitors from all parts of the country (in 2024 over 200,000 paid visits were recorded) not only because of their interest in promoting traditional arts and crafts which are on the edge of extinction, but also for the shows which occur daily.

Recently there have been about 800 exhibitors of various products including the arts and crafts of Portugal generally, and of the Algarve in particular: articles made of everything from textiles to copper and forged iron; lacework; artifacts made of wood; pottery and ceramics; cork items; basket work; or the typical Algarve puppets of Martim Longo and Querença.

Described as the largest exhibition south of the Tejo river, it has been visited throughout the years by a number of important figures, such as General António Ramalho Eanes, President of Portugal, in 1981, Prime Minister Mário Soares in 1984, and most recently by Marcelo Rebelo de Sousa, President of Portugal, in 2024. The fair also features headliner entertainers, such as the fado singer Mariza, on 27 August 2024.
