= Church of Our Lady of the Incarnation (Porches) =

- Parochial Church of Porches
- Igreja de Nossa Senhora da Encarnação
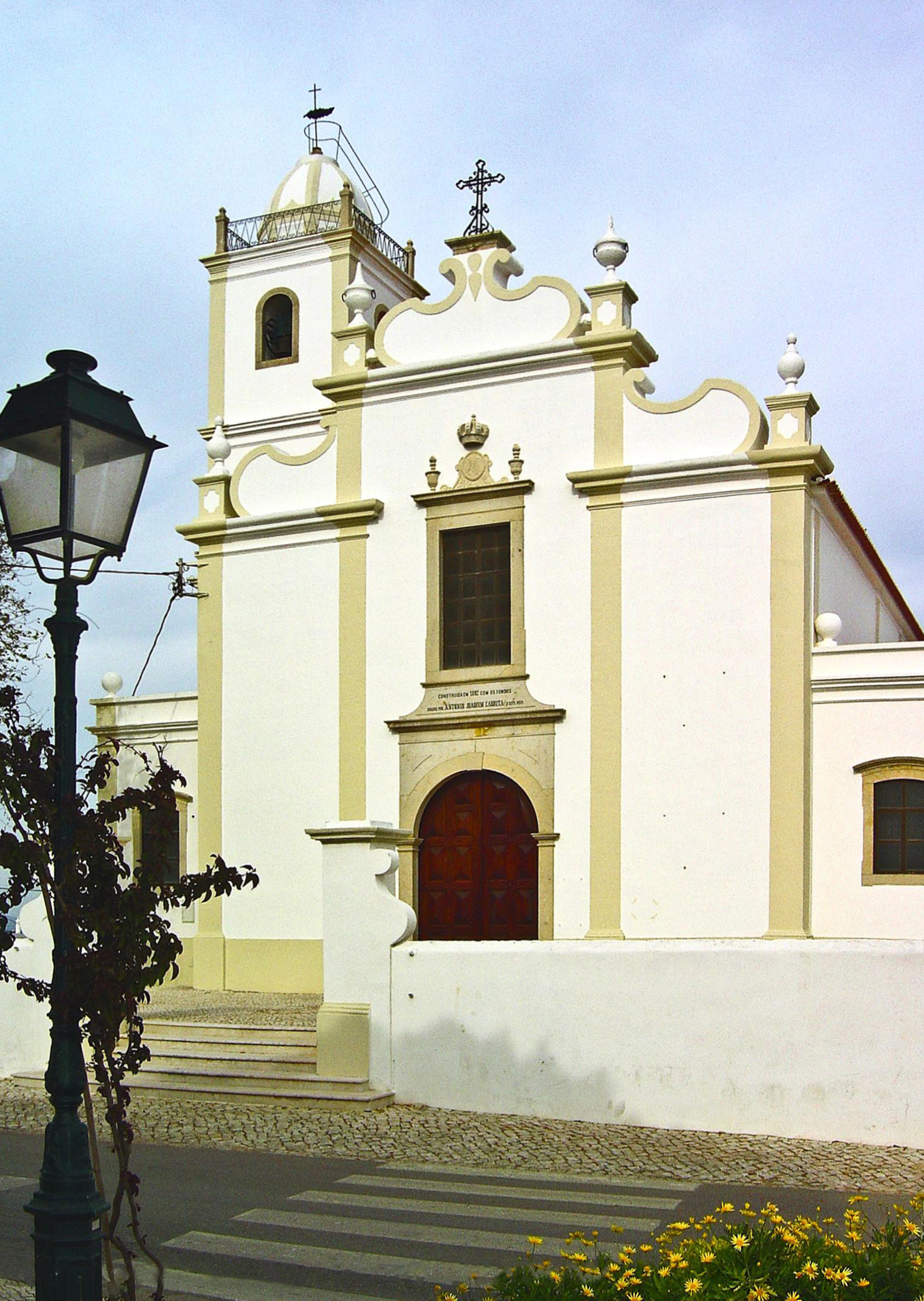
- The front facade of the parochial Church of Porches dedicated to Our Lady of the Incarnation
- Church of Our Lady of the Incarnation
- 37°7′31.65″N 8°23′56.05″W
- Location: Faro, Algarve, Algarve
- Country: Portugal

History
- Dedication: Our Lady of the Incarnation

Architecture
- Style: Baroque

Specifications
- Length: 30.15 m (98.9 ft)
- Width: 18.20 m (59.7 ft)

Administration
- Diocese: Roman Catholic Diocese of Faro

The Church of Our Lady of the Incarnation (or the Parochial Church of Porches) is a church situated in the civil parish of Porches, in the municipality of Lagoa in the Portuguese region of Algarve.

== History ==
Founded in the 16th century, the church retains a few vestiges of its early history. Only the chancel remains of the original church, which was later ruined by the 1755 earthquake.

It was sometime during the 18th century that azulejo tile was installed in the main nave.

A portion of the older temple was incorporated into the structure of the modern church, although remodeling in 1882 transformed the character of the present building.

== Architecture ==
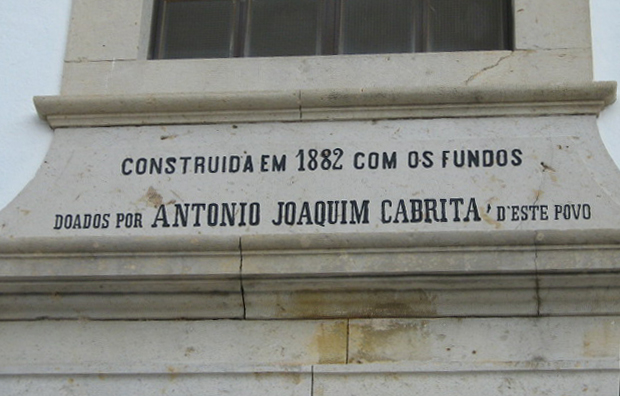
Inscription dedicated to philanthropist António Joaquim Cabrita, a benefactor of the parochial church

The exterior is an example of southern Portuguese church architecture with a somber facade. The principal facade is oriented towards the west, with a triptych portico aligned on either side by a square annexes, surmounted by royal crown.

The interior is notable for the chancel, dedicated to Our Lady of the Incarnation, with ribbed vaulting, and faced with tiles from the 17th century; and an 18th-century altar-piece of gilded carved wood with several images. The vaulted-ceiling within the presbytery is decorated in azulejo tile, while the chancel is gilded in gold.

More recently, the Irish artist, Patrick Swift, designed the stations of the cross for the church. Swift is buried in the local cemetery.
