= Estômbar =

- Civil parish
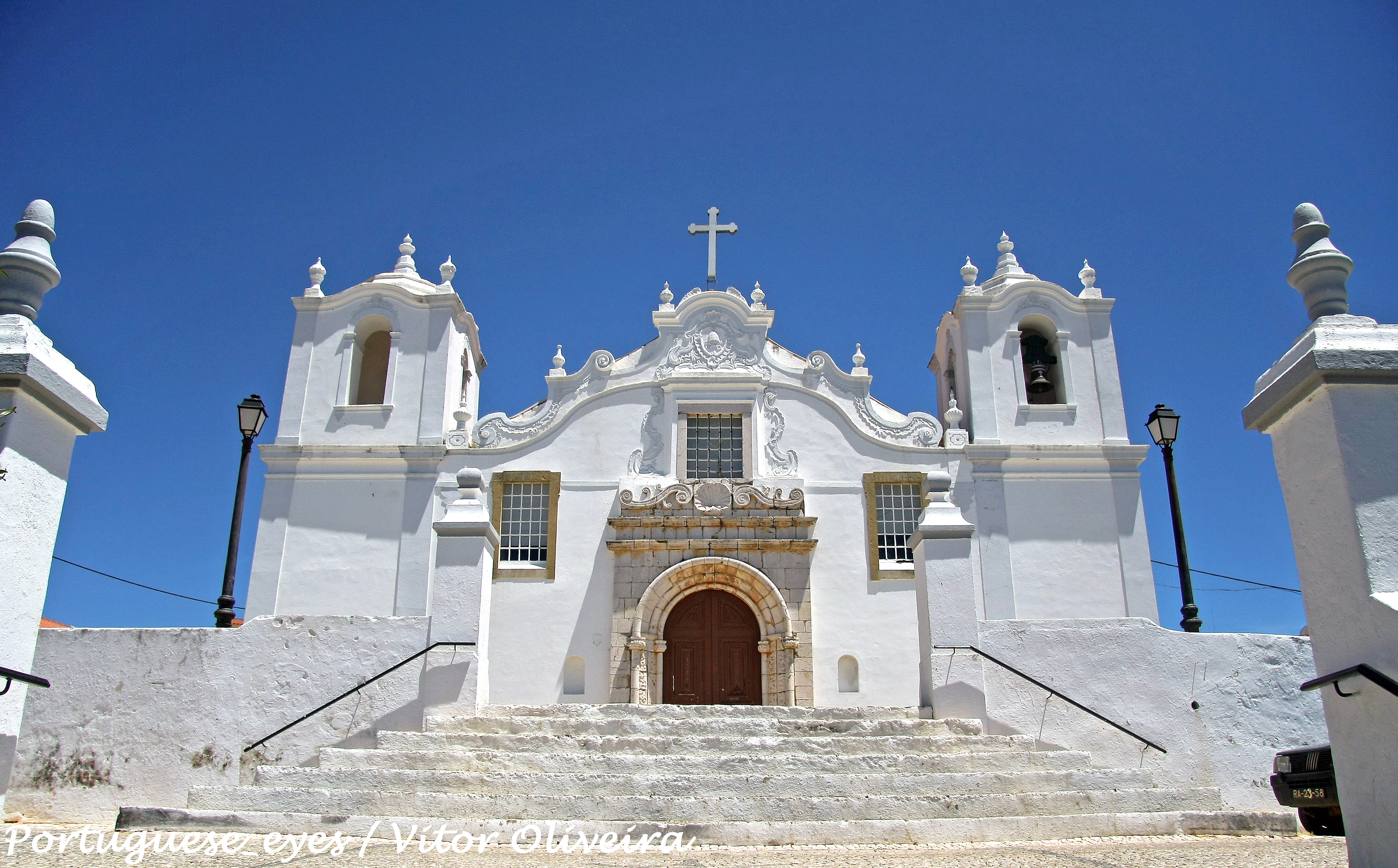
- Matrix church of Estômbar

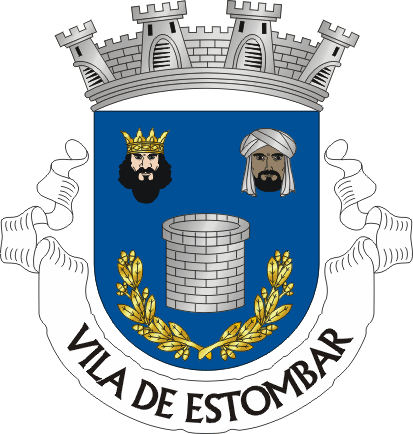
- Coat of arms

- Location in Portugal
- Coordinates: 37°08′45″N 08°29′10″W
- Country: Portugal
- Region: Algarve
- Intermunic. comm.: Algarve
- District: Faro
- Municipality: Lagoa
- Disbanded: 2013

Area
  - Total: 24.21 km^{2} (9.35 sq mi)

Population (2011)
  - Total: 4,985
  - Density: 205.9/km^{2} (533.3/sq mi)
- Time zone: UTC+00:00 (WET)
  - Summer (DST): UTC+01:00 (WEST)
- Postal code: 8400

Estômbar is a town in the civil parish of Estômbar e Parchal, in the municipality (concelho) of Lagoa, Portugal. The population in 2011 was 4,985, in an area of 24.21 km^{2}. It is situated just west of the city of Lagoa itself. Its civil status was raised to that of a town on August 16, 1991.

Estômbar is mainly as a bedroom community for Portimão, and many of its residents travel daily across the Rio Arade to work in the neighboring municipality.

Inhabitants are known as Estombarense.

== History ==
Estômbar is one of the oldest parishes in the Algarve. The whiteness of its buildings makes it the most Moorish-looking settlements in the concelho. Sanabus (or "Shombos"), its name at the time of the Arab occupation, constituted an important inland center with a castle called Abenabace, captured by the troops of King Sancho I in 1191. A number of important figures have called Estômbar their home over time, such as the poet Ibn Ammar, and the notorious bandit hero, Remexido, as well as members of the nobility and the clergy.

Because of its favorable position (up to the late 20th century it included the present freguesias of Ferragudo and Parchal along the Rio Arade), Estômbar was formerly a very prosperous economic center. Although based mainly on an agricultural economy, it also gained importance and wealth with the development of the salt industry and of trade on the Rio Arade. In the nineteenth and twentieth centuries it also was a center of fish canning which led to urban growth especially near the river bank. Today its economic life is mostly tied to the support of the tourist industry (e.g., civil construction and public works).

It was the seat of its own civil parish of Estômbar, but in 2013, the parish merged into the new parish Estômbar e Parchal.

== Historic sites ==
- Convento do São Francisco, also known as the “Convento do Praxel”
- Igreja Matriz (Estômbar), also known as the “Igreja de Santiago" (or "São Tiago”)

== Scenic/recreational sites ==
- Parque Municipal das Fontes

== Notable people ==
- Remexido or Remechido, the nickname of José Joaquim de Sousa Reis (Estômbar, 19 October 1796 – Faro, 2 August 1838), a civil servant and wealthy land tenant who became a notorious guerrilla leader of the Algarve in Portugal, defending the rights of king Miguel to the Portuguese throne and the antiliberal absolute monarchy in the Kingdom of Portugal.
