= Estômbar e Parchal =

- Civil parish
- Location in Portugal
- Coordinates: 37.14°N 8.50°W
- Country: Portugal
- Region: Algarve
- Intermunic. comm.: Algarve
- District: Faro
- Municipality: Lagoa

Area
  - Total: 28.07 km^{2} (10.84 sq mi)

Population (2011)
  - Total: 9,004
  - Density: 320.8/km^{2} (830.8/sq mi)
- Time zone: UTC+00:00 (WET)
  - Summer (DST): UTC+01:00 (WEST)

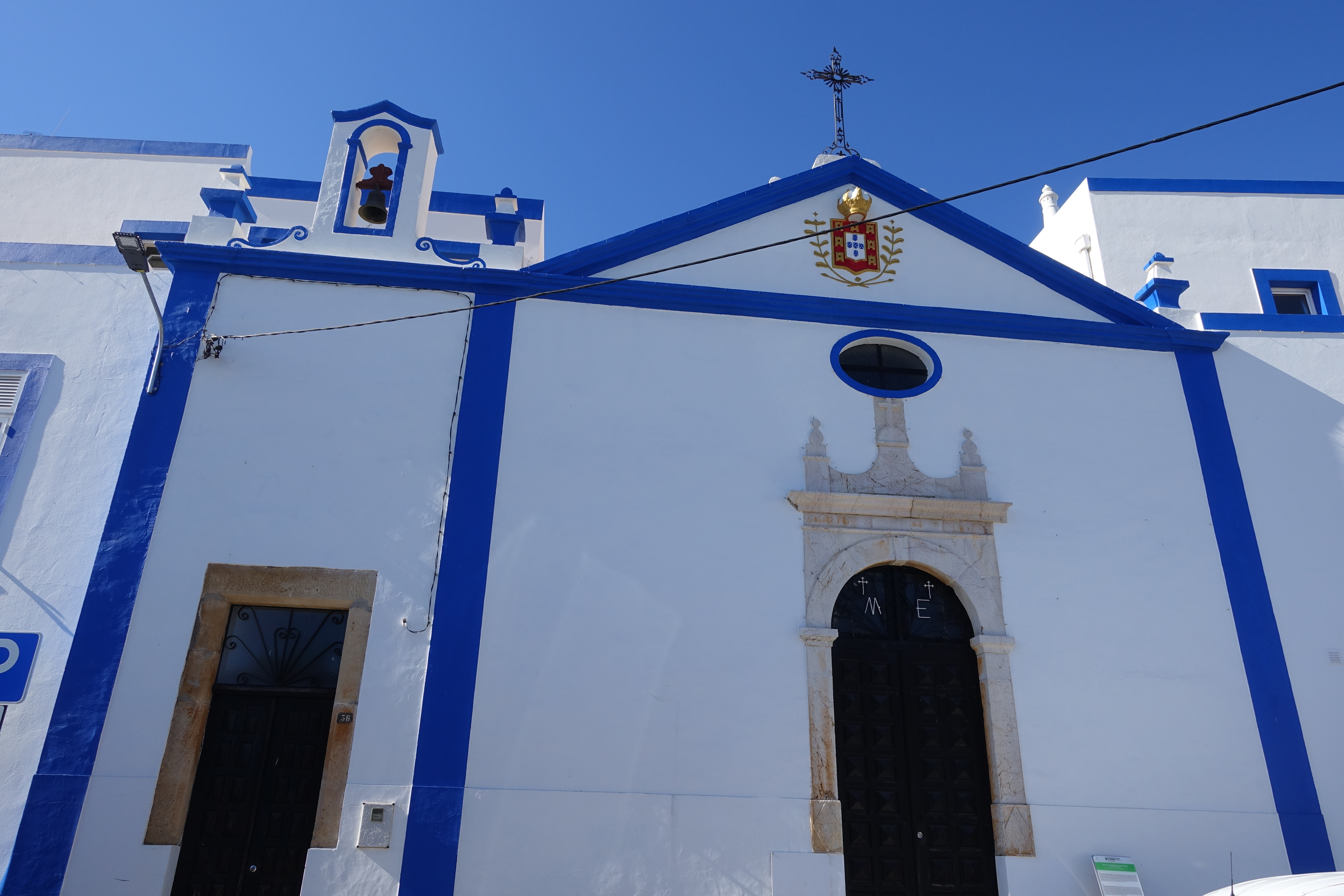
Church in Estômbar Lagoa Portugal.

Estômbar e Parchal is a civil parish in the municipality of Lagoa, Portugal. It was formed in 2013 by the merger of the former parishes Estômbar and Parchal. The population in 2011 was 9,004, in an area of 28.07 km^{2}.
