= Alagoas Brancas =

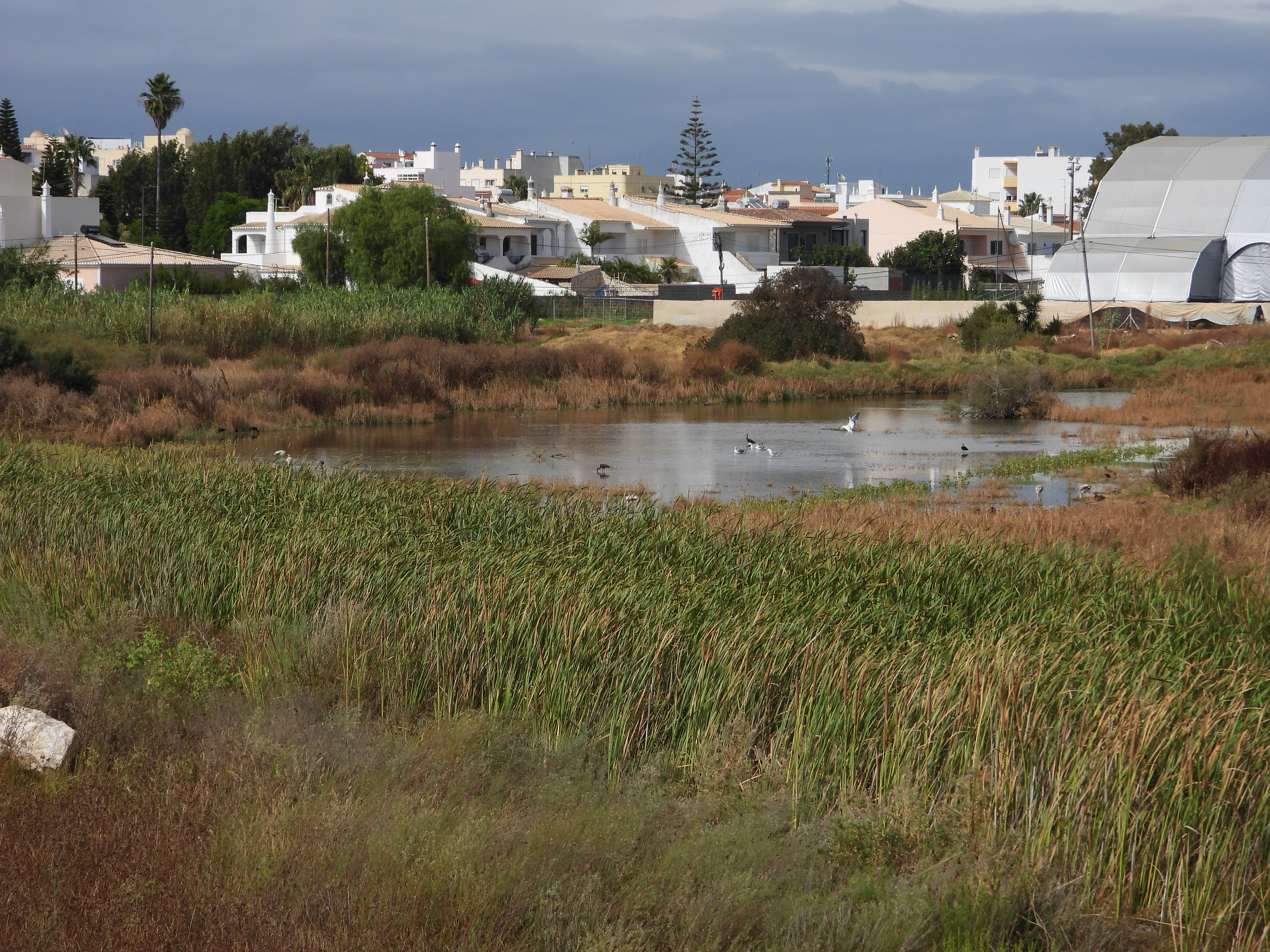
- Alagoas Brancas in September 2025

- Location within Portugal
- Location: Lagoa, Portugal
- Coordinates: 37.128606°N 8.452458°W
- Type: seasonal wetland
- Basin countries: Portugal
- Surface area: 0.084 km^{2} (0.032 sq mi)
- Settlements: Lagoa, Portugal
- Website: https://alagoasbrancas.pt/en/

Alagoas Brancas (lit. 'White Lakes') is a small seasonal wetland near the city of Lagoa in the Algarve, Portugal. The name makes reference to the large masses of white Ranunculus flowers that can be seen at the surface in spring. The area is popular with birdwatchers.

== Geology ==
Alagoas Brancas is part of an alluvial depression that extends northeast to the rice paddies of Quinta da Vala in the Silves municipality. The depression cuts through calcareous rock (limestone, calcarenite) and may have originally through the collapse of several smaller karstic depressions. Alagoas Brancas occupies a low point within the depression, and as a result becomes filled with water between winter and spring, and dries up in summer as the underground water levels drop.

== Conservation ==
Alagoas Brancas are the last remaining remnant of the large wetland after which the city of Lagoa (lit. 'Lake, pond') is named. Most of the area has been converted into an industrial area during the 20th century, and the existing fragment was scheduled for construction in 2020 to build a retail park. Initial excavations faced public outcry and protest by different environmental organisations and Movimento Salvar as Alagoas Brancas, an environmental movement of local residents, who launched a public petition. After public pressure, legal action, and the discovery of rare aquatic plant communities, the construction project was cancelled in 2023. The area was subsequently purchased by the Lagoa municipality in 2024, supported with environmental funds from the Portuguese Government.

== Birdwatching ==
Alagoas Brancas attracts important numbers of birds, which use the area for feeding, roosting and/or breeding. Large flocks of Western cattle egret (Ardea ibis) often roost on the trees during the night, with as many as 1000-2000 individuals being recorded simultaneously. Alagoas Brancas is also frequented by considerable numbers of glossy ibis (Plegadis falcinellus), and as many as 900 individuals have been recorded at the same time.
