= Convent of Saint Joseph (Lagoa) =

- Convento de São José
- Interactive map of the Convent of Saint Joseph area

General information
- Type: Convent
- Architectural style: Medieval
- Location: Lagoa, Lagoa, Portugal
- Coordinates: 37°8′13.7″N 8°27′13.2″W
- Opened: 1710; 316 years ago
- Owner: Portuguese Republic

Technical details
- Material: Concrete

The Convent of Saint Joseph (Portuguese: Convento de São José) is a former convent and current cultural centre of Lagoa, situated in the civil parish of Lagoa, urbanized part of the city of Lagoa, Portugal. Built on the north edge of the old quarter, with its belvedere tower straddling the main road north to Silves, it hosts exhibitions of painting, photography, sculpture and pottery, as well as various shows and discussions in its auditorium.

== History ==
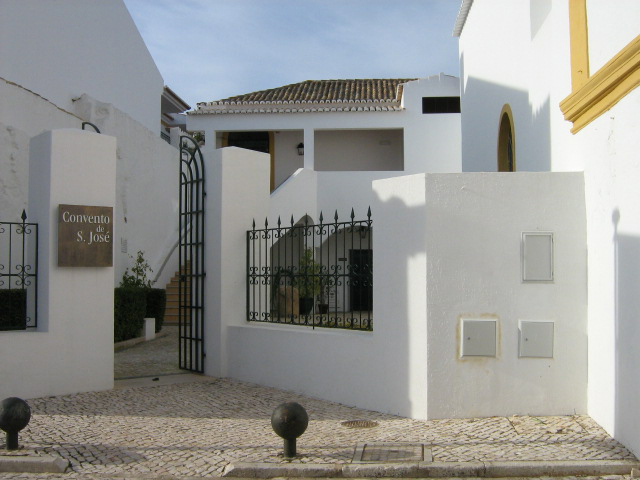
Entrance to the convent

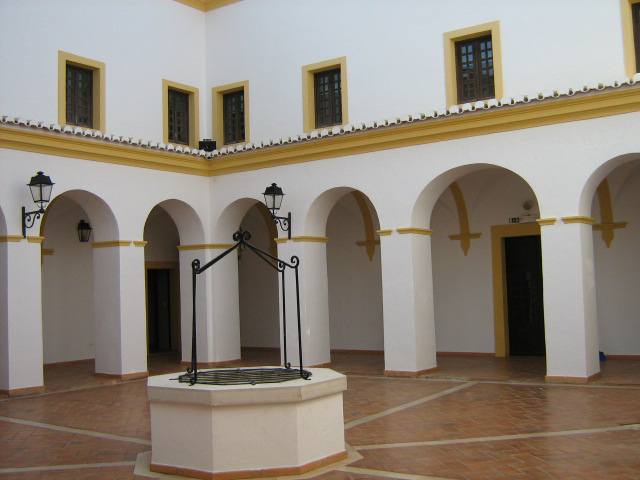
Courtyard or cloister

The convent appears to have been founded sometime between 1710 and 1713 (it is known to be in existence in 1730), by members of the Carmelite order of nuns, who fostered and educated abandoned girls. There still exists a (now disused) “baby wheel” or “foundling wheel” in the convent for the anonymous relinquishing of unwanted babies. The original building was seriously damaged in the 1755 earthquake and was rebuilt thereafter.

In 1834 the government of Portugal suppressed all religious orders and monastic houses in the country. The institution continued to function as a foster home, probably as an “Association of Poor Girls”. In 1876, after church-state relations had been more or less normalized, the convent was re-opened as a girls' school by a number of Third Order Dominican Sisters (or non-cloistered nuns). The establishment was well supported both in terms of recruitment and money by the local community. (While the law still forbade cloistered convents, “third order” institutions – including schools – under the jurisdiction of the ecclesiastical dioceses were allowed.) The school normally had about 30 boarders and 60 day students.

After the founding of the Portuguese First Republic in 1910, there was a formal separation of church and state under which the state took over all educational functions; the Convent was closed and the building came into the hands of the Comissão Jurisdicional dos Bens das Extintas Congregações Religiosas (Legal Commission for the Assets of Extinct Religious Congregations). At that time the São José convent was the only one in the Algarve. Much of the contents were sold or stolen; very few remain in Lagoa today.

In 1924 the building and grounds were purchased from the Comissão by the town of Lagoa which used it as a primary school up until the 1970s when a new purpose-built school was opened. At various times space in the convent was used for public offices – offices for the civil parish of Lagoa e Carvoeiro, for the engineering and service departments – and for storage. The chapel was used as the Civil Registry Office up to about 1940 after which it was restored and used for religious services. In 1961-1963 it functioned as the main town church while the principal church (Igreja Matriz) was being renovated. Services ended in the chapel in 1974 due to reduced attendance.

The chapel was renovated in 1989 at which time whatever of the original furnishings could be found were also restored and returned. The rest of the building was restored during 1992 and 1993 and the complex was re-opened on 27 May 1993 as the town's cultural centre. Part of the old building was appropriated by the civil parish authority of Lagoa e Carvoeiro where it continues to operate.

== Architecture ==
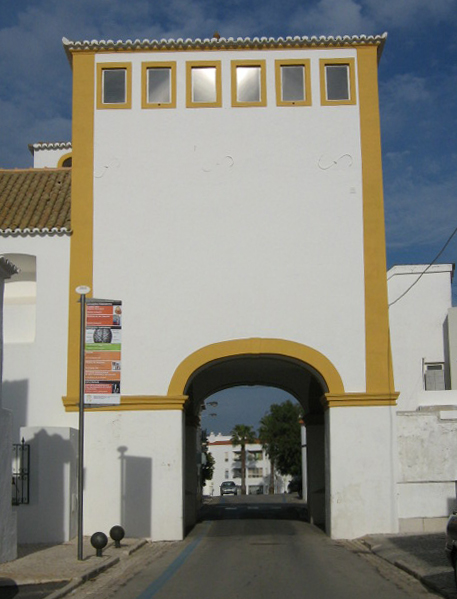
Belevdere tower

Built originally of limestone with lime mortar, the convent has been altered many times since its construction. The small chapel was restored in the mid-19th century by Luís Antonio Maravilhas; his design included a vaulted roof, a main altar, 6 more altars in the side arches, and Ionic-style pilasters. This is more or less the shape it has today. Among the restored furnishings there are carved altar-pieces and an image of the patron saint, Saint Joseph with the Christ Child (18th century).

In front of the building is a belvedere tower built on an archway over the street. The bell gable has two bells, one 55 x 64 cm, weighing 190 kg and dated 1794; the second is 33 x 37 cm and weighs 34 kg. The original entrance to the convent was to the left of the tower (with a vestibule and parlor as well as the baby wheel); this area now houses the civil parish offices. A new entrance has been constructed to the right of the tower in what used to be the vestry courtyard. The cloister has a subterranean cistern to catch rain water; it is accessed by an octagonal “well” in its centre. Many of the rooms around the cloister (on both floors) have been opened up and converted into connected exhibition rooms. An auditorium was added during the last renovations.

In the entrance garden is a menhir, found in the Areias das Almas, Porches, dated to sometime between 5000 and 4000 B.C. It was discovered during an archaeological dig in 1975-76 by Varela Gomes.
