= Porches (Lagoa) =

- Civil parish
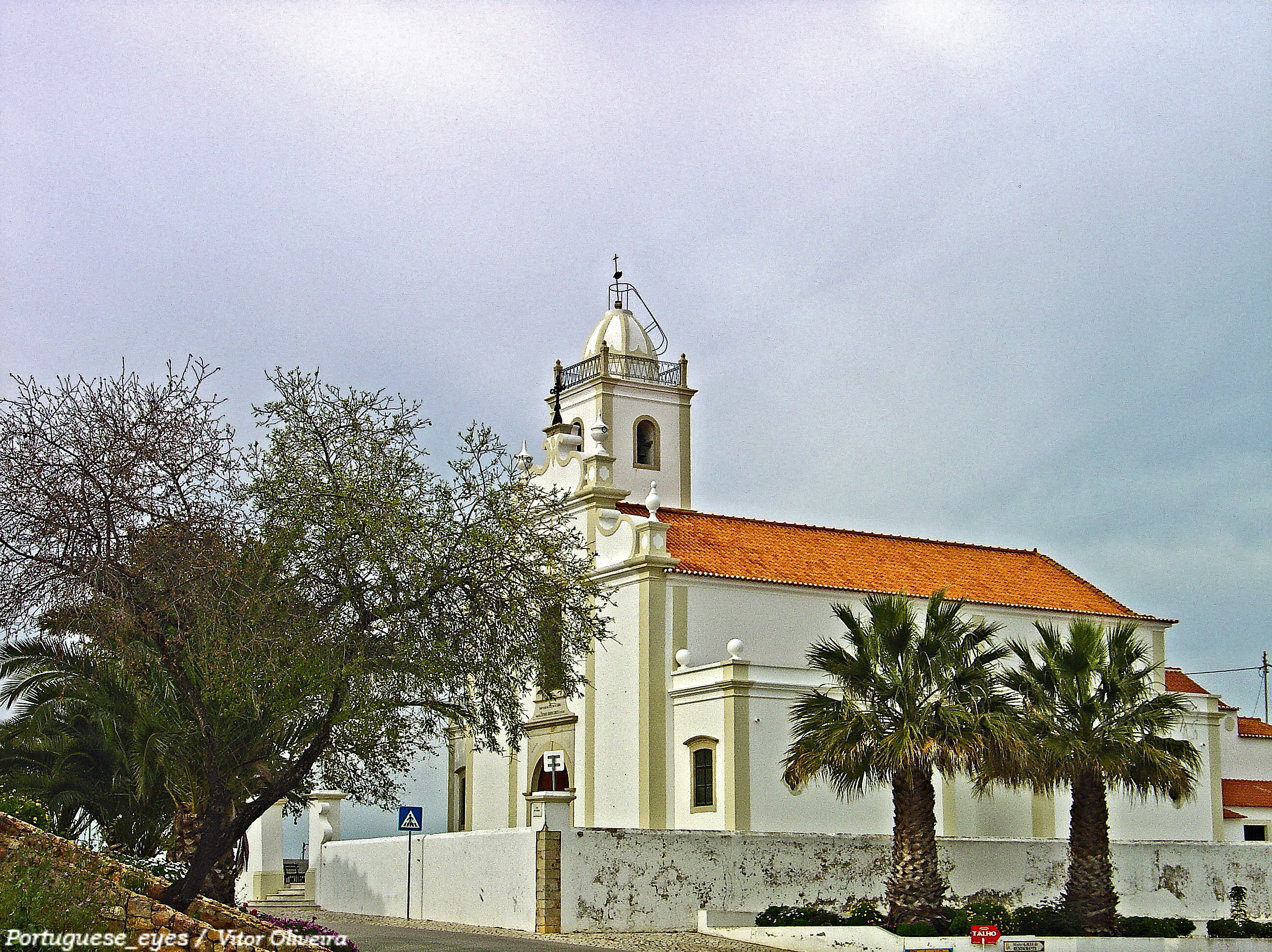
- The village entrance with the Parish Church

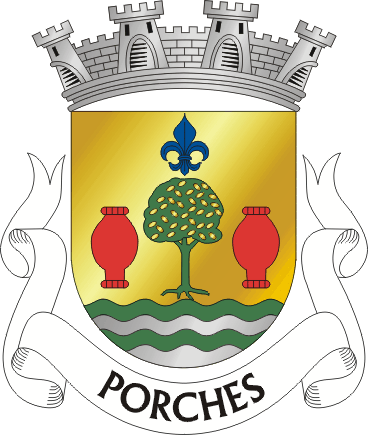
- Coat of arms

- Location in Portugal
- Coordinates: 37.126°N 8.398°W
- Country: Portugal
- Region: Algarve
- Intermunic. comm.: Algarve
- District: Faro
- Municipality: Lagoa

Area
  - Total: 15.64 km^{2} (6.04 sq mi)

Population (2011)
  - Total: 2,011
  - Density: 128.6/km^{2} (333.0/sq mi)
- Time zone: UTC+00:00 (WET)
  - Summer (DST): UTC+01:00 (WEST)
- Postal code: 8400

Porches is a civil parish/freguesia in the municipality of Lagoa in Portugal, about 10 km east of the city of Lagoa. The population in 2011 was 2,011, in an area of 15.64 km^{2}. It was elevated to the status of a town on July 12, 2001.

== History ==
Perched on a hill on the edge of the oldest east–west road in the Algarve is the small town of Porches. Vestiges of continuous occupation going back as far as the Neolithic Age have been found in the area of the freguesia. A menhir, found in this area and dated to sometime between 5000 and 4000 BC, is now in the entrance garden of the Convent of Saint Joseph in Lagoa.

According to historical sources, the actual settlement of Porches was in the middle of the 16th century, built by a group of settlers who came from an older urbanization called Porches Velho, situated within the freguesia but closer to the coast. Porches Velho had been occupied during the Roman period, and in 1253 it was already a sizeable town, seat of a judicial district and with a strong medieval castle.

The area of Porches is well known for its wine, but also for its clay pits and pottery workshops and its current inhabitants still make pottery, continuing to keep this art alive. Pottery had been re-introduced to the area when the artists Patrick Swift (who also designed the stations of the cross at Porches Church) and Lima de Freitas set up Porches Pottery (Olaria Algarve) in 1968, which still produces handpainted pottery. With the increase in tourism the prosperity of the Porches pottery industry has returned, and both traditional designs and new artistic styles are produced.

The typical Porches chimneys are original, colourful and very old. Each was ordered to be built according to the wealth of the family. The master always asked how many days he wanted the chimney to be made. Depending on the working days, the more expensive, bigger and more ornate it would be. One of the most emblematic is located under the Casa Museu, on Rua da Chaminé. It features a keep, a spoked wheel and a human figure. It dates from 1793. In Travessa do Correio there is another one, from the 18th century, with four sides. Also noteworthy is the chimney of the Leão de Porches restaurant, installed in an impressive restored 18th-century building. Here we find a lion crowned with vine leaves. Legend has it that many years ago a baby lion appeared in the village.

The Atlantic coastal border of the Porches District is home to a thriving beach tourist industry, with numerous beaches and rocky areas with caves and arches.

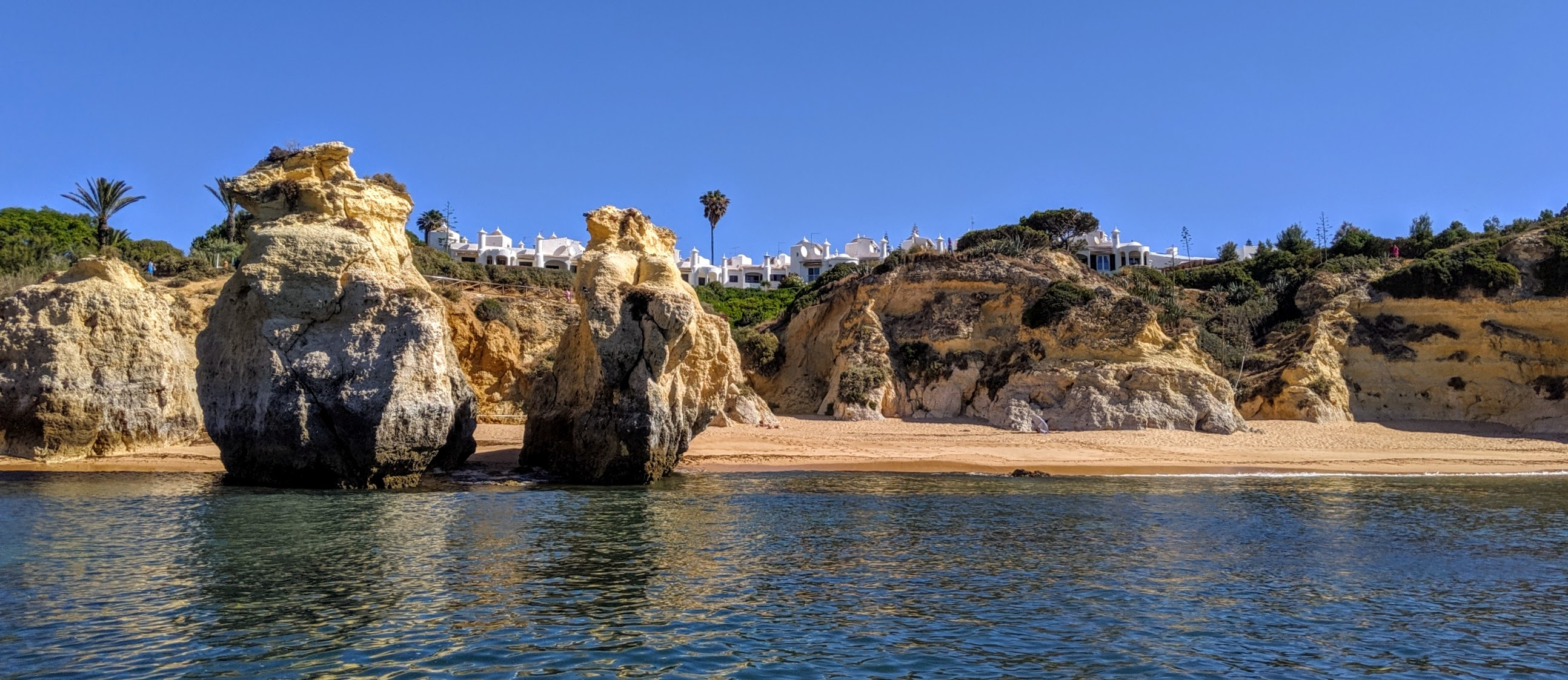
Praia dos Beijinhos (Beijinhos Beach) view from a boat
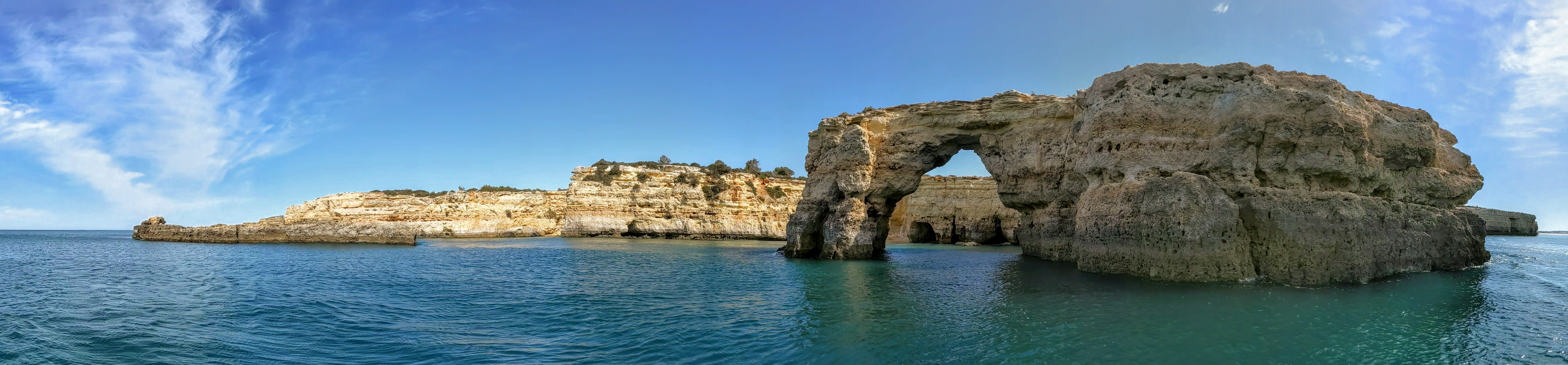
Arco de Albandeira, by the beach Praia de Albandeira, panoramic view from a boat

== Heritage Sites ==
- Fort of Our Lady of the Rock, also known as Porches castle, with its Marian shrine
- Church of Our Lady of the Incarnation

== See also ==
- Beach of Our Lady of the Rock
- New Beach
