= Church of Our Lady of Light (Lagoa) =

- Parish Church of Lagoa
- Igreja de Nossa Senhora da Luz
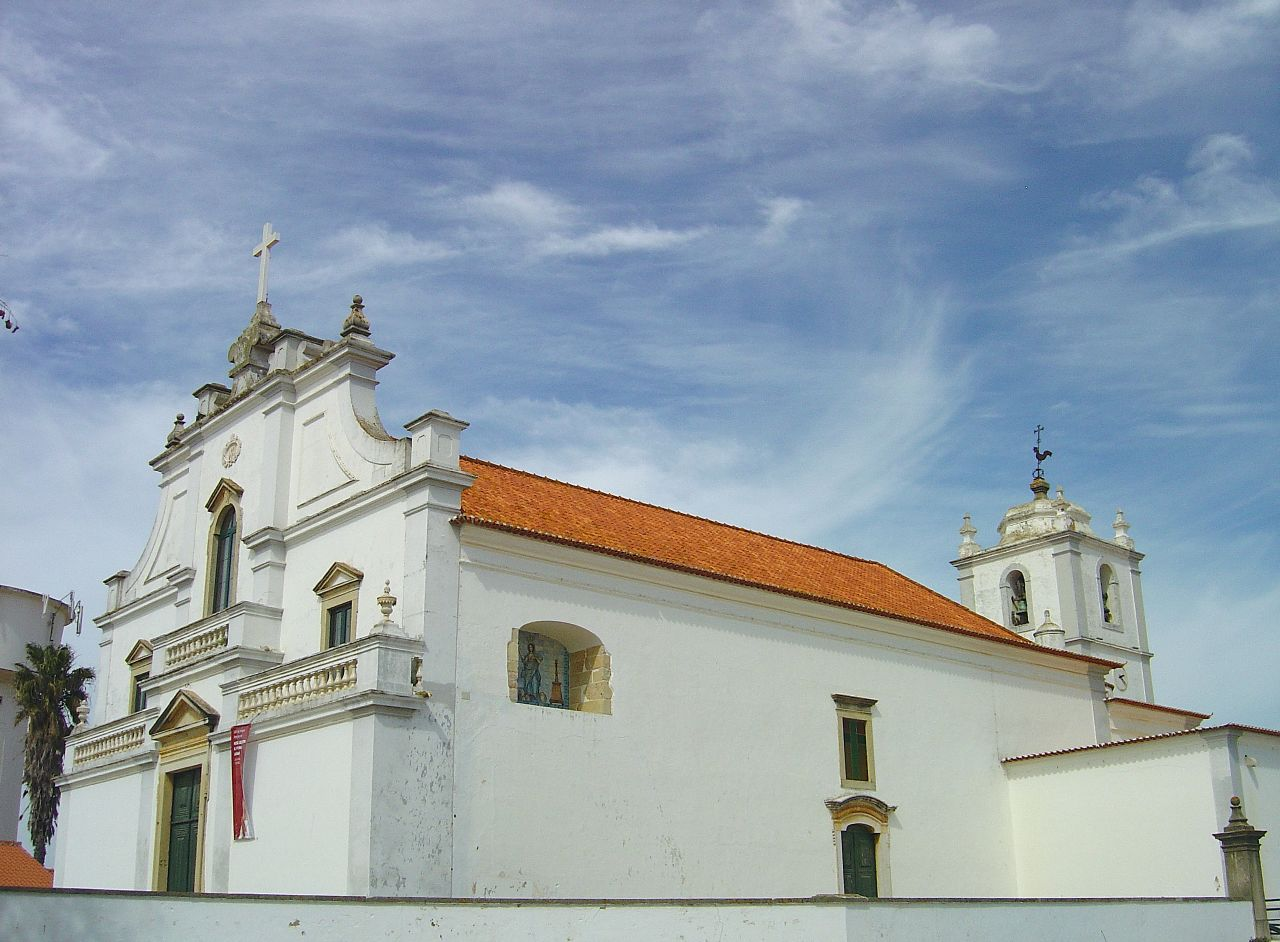
- The Parish church of Our Lady of Light of Lagoa
- Church of Our Lady of Light
- Location: Lagoa, Faro District, Algarve
- Country: Portugal
- Website: Official website

History
- Dedication: Virgin Mary

Architecture
- Style: Medieval

Administration
- Diocese: Roman Catholic Diocese of Faro

The Church of Our Lady of Light (Portuguese: Igreja de Nossa Senhora da Luz) is a church situated in civil parish of Lagoa and Carvoeiro, in the municipality of Lagoa, in the Portuguese Algarve region, situated in the urban centre.

== History ==
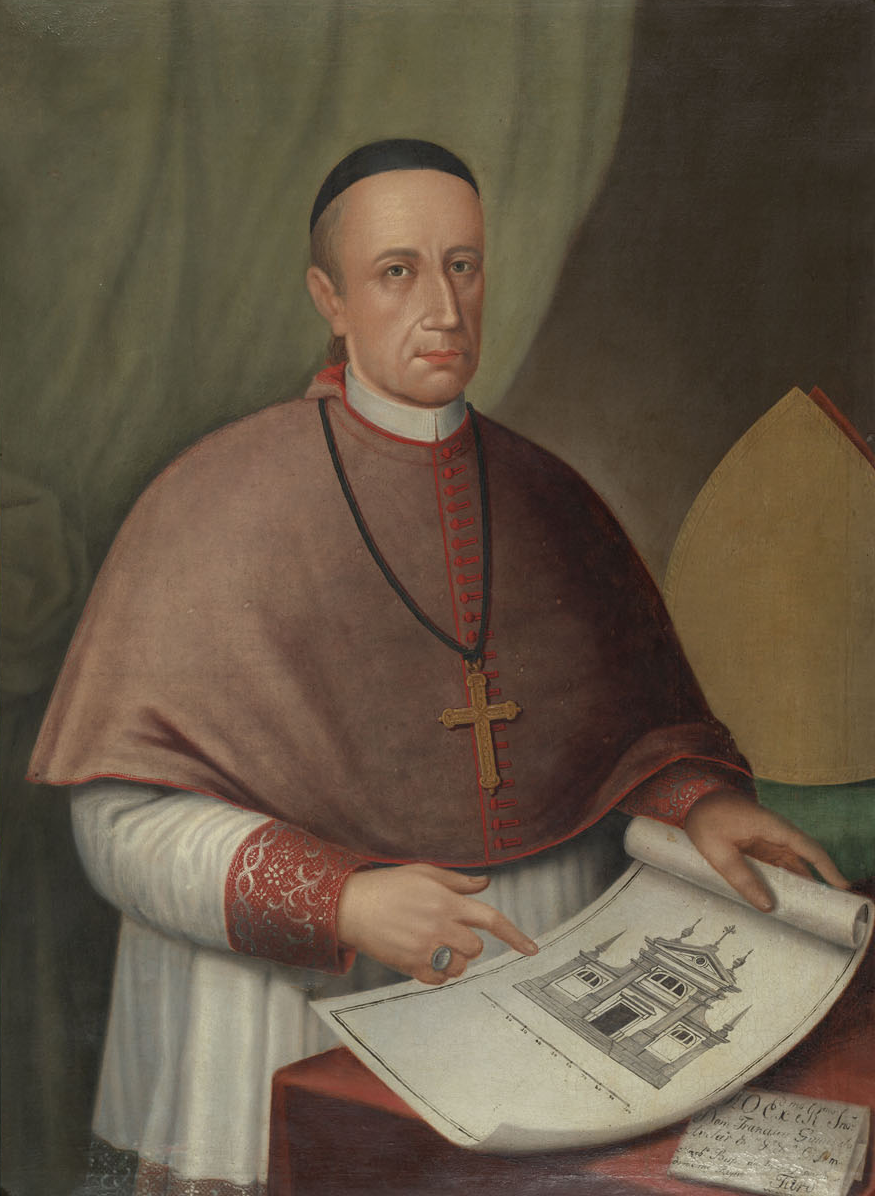
Bishop Francisco Gomes de Avelar.

As happened elsewhere in the Algarve, it is highly probable that Lagoa was raised to the status of a parish in the diocese of Silves at the beginning of the 16th century (while Lagoa itself was still part of the municipality/concelho of Silves. This change in status led to the construction of a new building in the prevailing Manueline style. The usual design of the time for principal churches involved a tripartite nave, five bays, no transept, and three altars at the front.

This earlier church was badly damaged in the 1755 earthquake. All that has survived is a Manueline doorway integrated into the bell tower, and certain architectural elements visible in the sacristy which were incorporated as fill material in the 18th-century reconstruction and which are occasionally rediscovered during renovations.

As for the reconstruction itself, there survives a contract from 1764 between Luís Coelho da Silva of Monchique and the head of the elected Building Commission (Comissão Fabriqueira), Diogo Tavares, for furnishing wood for the church. (Tavares was a professional builder and the most prestigious stonemason and contractor in the Algarve. At the time he was living in Lagoa). The main door and the three windows of the principle facade were only rebuilt in 1809 by the Faro stonemason, António Xavier de Mendonça using stone cut in the quarry of São Lourenço. The building was finally consecrated on 4 September 1814 by Bishop D. Francisco Gomes de Avelar.

The columns and arches in the nave date from the third quarter of the 18th century, erected under the supervision of Diogo Tavares. They are similar to what can be seen in the principal churches of Estômbar, Portimão, and in Saint Peter (São Pedro) of Faro and represent a style that at the time seems to have been limited to the Algarve.

== Architecture ==
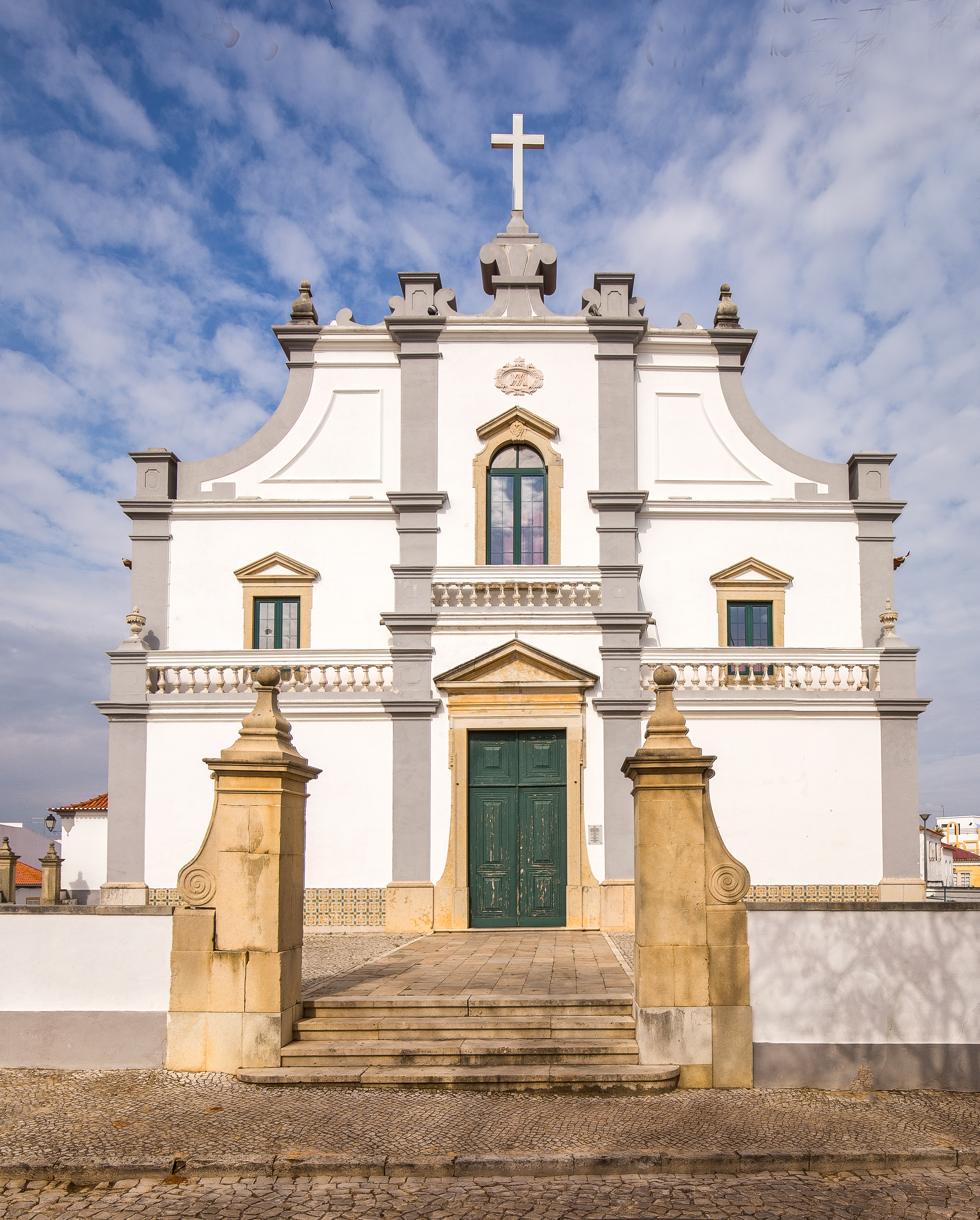
Facade of the Church of Our Lady of Light in Lagoa, Algarve.

As for the ornamentation of the chancel and chapels, a contract survives, dated 22 September 1770, between the parish priest, Fr. Ignácio de Oliveira e Sousa, and one of the most well-known artists of the Algarve, master-carver Manuel Francisco Xavier, for the commission to create five altar-pieces in the latest style out of wood from Flanders for the price of 700 réis. In the end, three of these altar-pieces were never completed (the ones for the chancel and the collateral chapels); the fate of the other two (for the chapels of St. Sebastian and St. Anthony) are unknown.

The altarpiece of the chancel is representative of the 19th century. During the episcopal visit of 1803 it was noted that a new altarpiece needed to be constructed as soon as possible. In the following year 500 réis was budgeted for it and master-carver Mathias José de Sousa, a resident of Lagoa at the time, was responsible for the work. An analysis of the piece, however, shows strong ties to 18th-century carving, not only in the dynamism of its design, but also in the preservation of columns with straight channelled shafts and in the two angels set on the curved segment of the upper section. (It is possible that the earlier sketch by Manuel Francisco Xavier was adapted in large part by Mathias.) The image on the main altar is of Our Lady of Light, the patron saint of the church (and of Lagoa).

The 6 side altarpieces, despite some later interventions, display great similarities to each other, indicating that they belong to a common program and that they were created in the same workshop. There is a certain formality about them – a plain or rectangular design contrasting with the dynamism of the pedestals, of the “tree-trunk” pillars, and of the ornamentation, especially at the top. Beyond the usual principles of design – dignity suiting the House of God, presenting to the faithful one of the possible representations of heaven, and the framing of figures who stand out for their exemplary lives – there are other, more specific ones: the adoption of a common decorative program, a strong emphasis on the parish priest, and the possible eventual participation of a confraternity or brotherhood (probably without any members of high social status or wealth).

=== Treasurers ===
The church houses a small collection of religious objects (sculpture and reliquaries), about 3 dozen examples from the 17th, 18th and 19th centuries, some of which come from the Carmelite Convent of Saint Joseph, and from two shrines elsewhere in town. Among these objects is a silver censer, and a carved image of the Christ Child. The censer, in the shape of a boat, is still used today during the most solemn ceremonies. Its profusion of ornamentation with volutes, acanthus leaves, seraphim heads, etc. is characteristic of the Baroque period of the first half of the 18th century. There is no information about its creator, but it was probably one of the Algarve artists well known for this type of work.

The wooden image of the Christ Child is also Baroque from the first half of the 18th century. It was destined for an oratory and when created it was sitting on some sort of chair. In the third quarter of the 18th century a bed of wood was made for it, in the Rococo style. From the moment it was presented to the church it has had great popular appeal, especially at Christmas time when it is kissed by the faithful.

The chest of drawers in the sacristy is contemporary with the carving of the side altars but seems to be from a different workshop, and is an important example of Rococo carving.
