= Fort of Nossa Senhora da Rocha (Porches) =

Fort in Porches, Lagoa, Portugal

- Forte de Nossa Senhora da Rocha
- Faro, Algarve, Algarve in Portugal
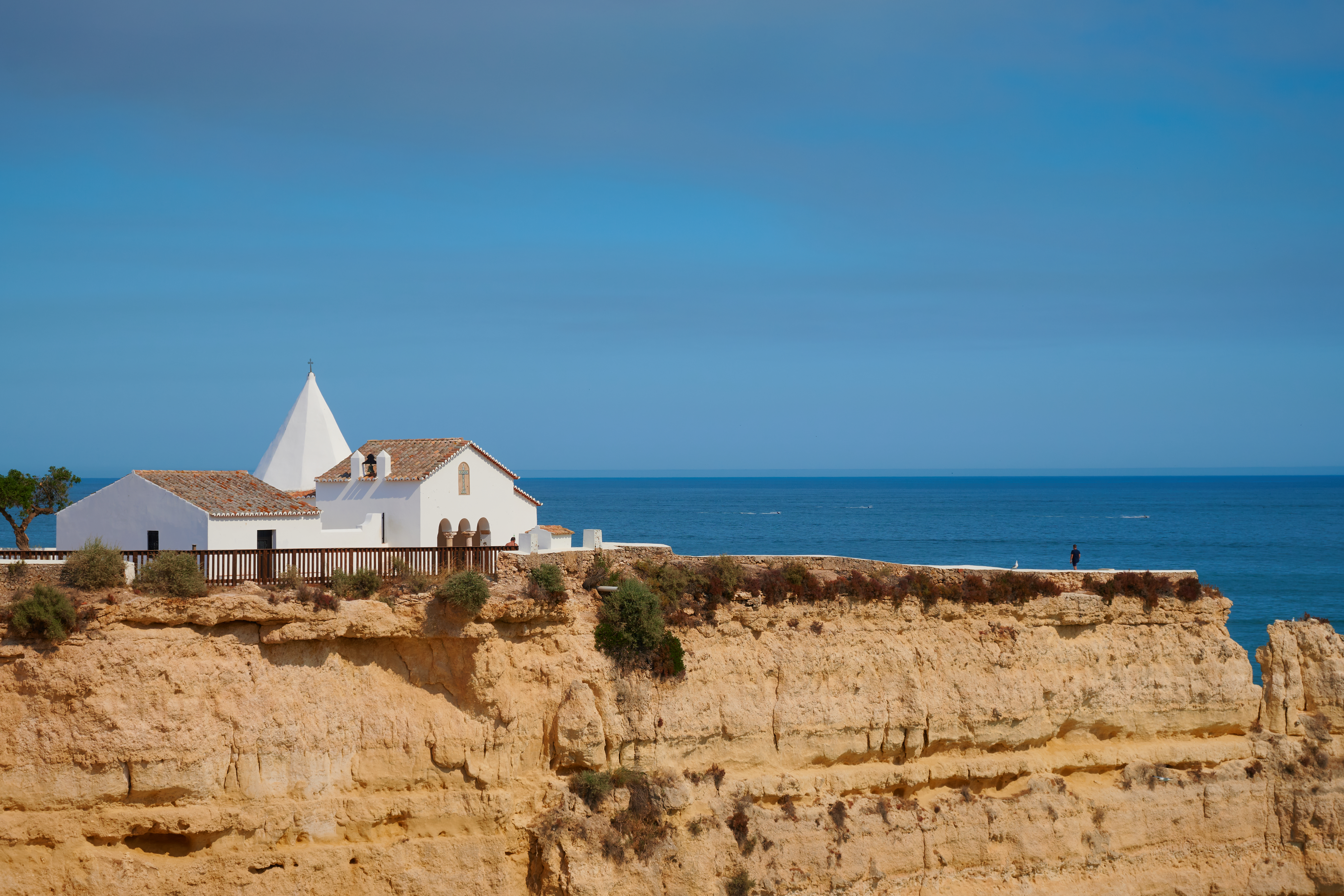
- The Chapel of Nossa Senhora da Rocha on the promontory overlooking the beach of the same name

Site information
- Type: Fort
- Owner: Portuguese Republic
- Operator: DRCAlgarve, Decree 34/2007 (20 March 2007)
- Open to the public: Public

Location
- Coordinates: 37°5′44.35″N 8°23′10.26″W

Site history
- Built: 8th Century
- Materials: Stone, Masonry, Tile, Woodwork

The Fort of Nossa Senhora da Rocha (also known as the Fort of Our Lady of the Rock or Castle of Porches) is a medieval castle situated in the civil parish of Porches, in the municipality of Lagoa in Portuguese Algarve. Inside the fort is the Chapel of Nossa Senhora da Rocha, of uncertain date.

== History ==
Doubt continues to exist as to the origin of the Chapel of Nossa Senhora da Rocha, as well as the original fort that existed on this site. The privileged location on a promontory reflects the importance of the site, which was fortified to help secure the coast from Ossonoba (Faro) to Lacobriga (Lagos), as well as protecting the beach and maritime access. The 8th century is normally used as a reference, suggesting a construction based on the reuse of existing Roman-era elements. The actual configuration of the temple is difficult to catalog. On one hand, the constructors reused the capitals, presupposing a public construction that occurred in the High Middle Ages. On the other hand, successive remodelling, painting and lack of prior archaeological excavations has made rigorous analysis impossible; this lack of information has contributed to the difficulty in dating and contextualizing the style of architecture. Despite a lack of archaeological research, scholars believe that at the time of the Muslim invasion of the Iberian peninsula, the site was already a military fortification.

In the last few years, different authors have suggested distinct hypothesizes to explain the origin of the temple. Teresa Gamito, on studying the Byzantine presence in the Algarve, saw in the chapel proof of the vitality of Byzantine reconquest of the peninsula. To the author, the configuration of the atrium and its similarity with the Chapel of São Pedro de Balsemão, were proofs confirming the Byzantine origins of the temple, whose oriental design was verifiable in the Visigothic epoch. The confusion evident in Gamito's arguments were later reexamined by Manuel Justino Maciel, who systematically deconstructed the indications of its Byzantine-Visigothic construction, while not specifically advancing new data on the building.

There are no local records which shed light on the castle or fort, and it is not mentioned in writings until a grant by King Afonso III to his chancellor, D. Estevão (in a document sent to the people of Santa Maria de Faro), dated February 1250. Equally problematic was the proposal of Cláudio Torres, who saw in the chapel a "centre of pilgrimage in the Mozarab epoch". The reuse of capitals during the Middle Ages was not only limited to this period, but also again reused during the 9th to 11th century.

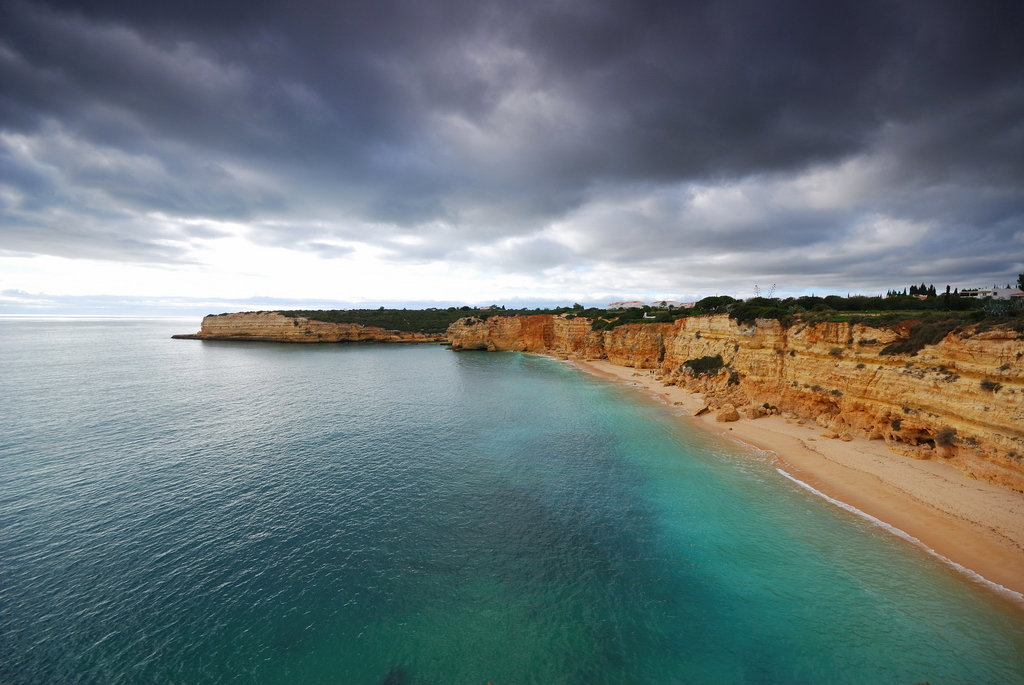
The distant Chapel as seen from the promontory, as seen from the east

During the 13th century, King Denis ordered the construction of a fortress to protect the hermitage, whose construction, following the legend of that time, was located on the site of a mysterious Marian apparition.

King John III ordered a reconstruction of the fort around the 16th century, owing to cases of invasions/incursions by Moorish pirates, as well as the defense of the beach for trade.

But dating of the fort is still unclear; there is secure information only after the end of the 16th century, at the time when Tomé Gonçalves was identified as governor. But, by 1821, the fort was encountered in an advance state of ruin; there was no indication as to the original perimeter/extent of this fortress. It is likely that much of what remains of the fortress was destroyed through successive landslides and destruction caused by ocean swells (to this date, its perimeter continues to be threatened ocean forces).

A final phase of remodelling and reconstruction occurred in the 19th century.

The site was partially restored by the Direcção-Geral dos Edifícios e Monumentos Nacionais (Directorate-General of Buildings and National Monuments), during the 1960s, while proposals to investigate and protect the monument were submitted. This included the reconstruction of the walls and repairs to the fort and chapel, demolition of the roof, repairs to the azulejo tile and reconstruction of the pavements (accomplished in 1963); the replacement of the doors and window frames (in 1964); the reconstruction and repair of the pavements and azulejos (in 1965); and the restoration of the walls, repair of the cupola and a clean-up of the landscape within the vicinity of the structures (in 1968). Following an earthquake in 1969, much of the existing fortress was damaged or destroyed.

In 1976, the walls were once again consolidated and new azulejos were added to the chapel. The whitewashing of the structure was completed in 1977.

A new initiative to repair the walls, which also included touches to the chapel and annexes, were completed in 1986.

The site came under the protection of the IPPAR (Instituto Português do Património Arquitectónicoon) on 1 June 1992, under decree law 106F/92, passing under the control of the IGESPAR when this organization took over these responsibilities and jurisdictions.

The chapel is the destination of pilgrimages and annual processions, with the primary festival day associated with the first Sunday of August. During the religious processions the image of the Virgin is taken from the fort, down to the beach.

== Architecture ==
The chapel is composed of two spaces essentially: a large rectangular narthex, open to the exterior through a triple arcade of columns and two Corinthian capitals (dated to the 3rd-4th century); and a rectangular space with cupola, atypical of other regional religious temples. The articulated volumes includes horizontal spaces with tiled roof over the main annex, while the aba extending to the sacristy and pyramidal spire over the main chapel.

The main façade of the chapel (oriented towards the west), includes two spaces that correspond to the galilé and sacristy (which is slightly recessed). The body of the galilé is marked by three arches over two columns of shafts, consisting of a concave base and plinth, with the northern relief consisting of scrolls and palmettes with stylized triangles.

In the interior, the cupola is covered by wood with a modern retable, divided into three section, aligned to the eastern-facing wall. It is marked by a rounded arch, with its nave extending to an altar composed of retable with four ionic columns, presenting an image of the Virgin Mary. The octagonal false cupola is covered in wood framework.

The fort is constituted by a curtain of walls marked by a main gate. The sides of the structures and spire are constructed of reused masonry white-washed and in grey.
