= Lagoa, Portugal =

Lagoa
- Municipality
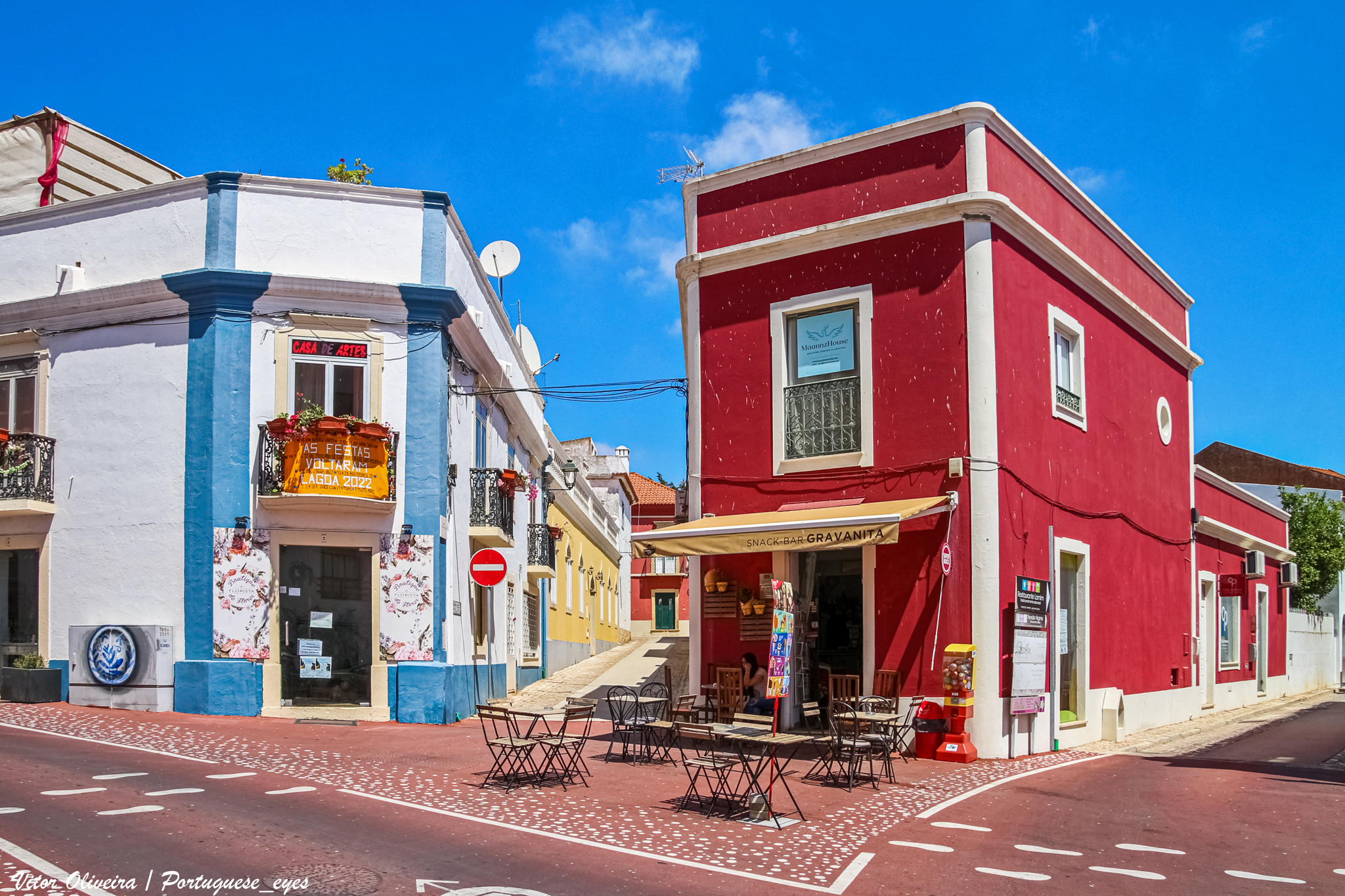
- Iconic coloured street in Lagoa, Algarve

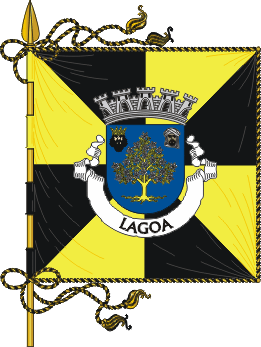
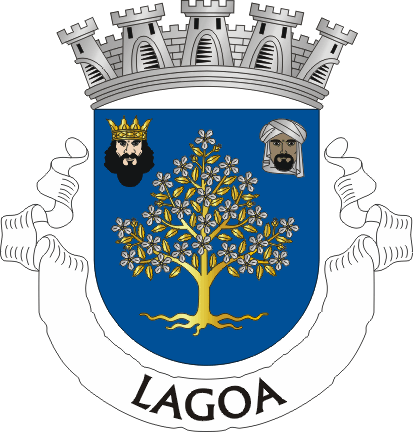
- Flag Coat of arms
- Interactive map of Lagoa
- Location in Portugal
- Coordinates: 37°8′N 8°27′W
- Country: Portugal
- Region: Algarve
- Intermunic. comm.: Algarve
- District: Faro
- Parishes: 4

Government
  - President: Francisco José Malveiro Martins (PS)

Area
  - Total: 88.25 km^{2} (34.07 sq mi)
- Lowest elevation: 0 m (0 ft)

Population (2011)
  - Total: 22,975
  - Density: 260.3/km^{2} (674.3/sq mi)
- Time zone: UTC+00:00 (WET)
  - Summer (DST): UTC+01:00 (WEST)
- Postal code: 8400
- Patron: Our Lady of Light
- Website: https://welcometolagoa.pt/en/

Lagoa (European Portuguese pronunciation: [lɐˈɣoɐ]) is a city and municipality in the district of Faro, in the Portuguese region of Algarve. The population of the municipality in 2011 was 22,975, in an area of 88.25 km^{2}. Its urban population, in the city of Lagoa proper, is 6,100 inhabitants. An important travel destination, its coast has won numerous accolades. Marinha Beach was considered by the Michelin Guide as one of the 10 most beautiful beaches in Europe and as one of the 100 most beautiful beaches in the world.

== History ==
According to some historical sources, the earliest settlement in the area occurred along the edges of small lakes or marshes (Portuguese: lagoa), which were drained in order to create a fertile land, although a small remnant wetland, Alagoas Brancas, can still be seen to the southeast of the city centre. There are many pre-historic vestiges of the early settlements, including menhirs (standing stones), funerary necropoles and artifacts that date a human presence to remote history. After the Celtiberian era, including the age of Cynete presence and domination, followed by the arrival of the Roman Empire and then the Visigoths, the entire region of the Algarve was conquered and ruled by Arabs when they moved into the Iberian peninsula in the 8th century.

When the area was later reconquered in the mid-12th century by Christian forces from the north, it was integrated into the fledgling Kingdom of Portugal. Muslim influence in Lagoa was profound, from the rich patrimony left behind, not only in neighboring Silves (then taifa capital), but also in Lagoa where commerce thrived.

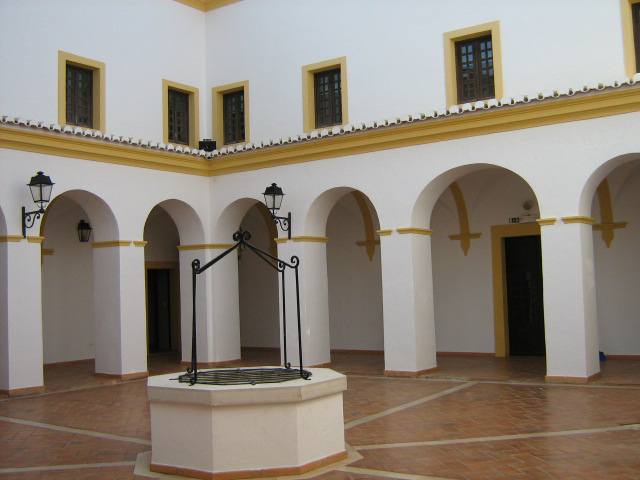
Cloister of the Convent of Saint Joseph from Carmelite nuns

During the 14th century, a favorable confluence of conditions allowed Lagoa to develop rapidly. Yet, the events of the 1755 Lisbon earthquake left little marks from this period: the reconstruction wiped away many of its classic architecture (there are a rare few of this period, including the churches of Estômbar and Porches).

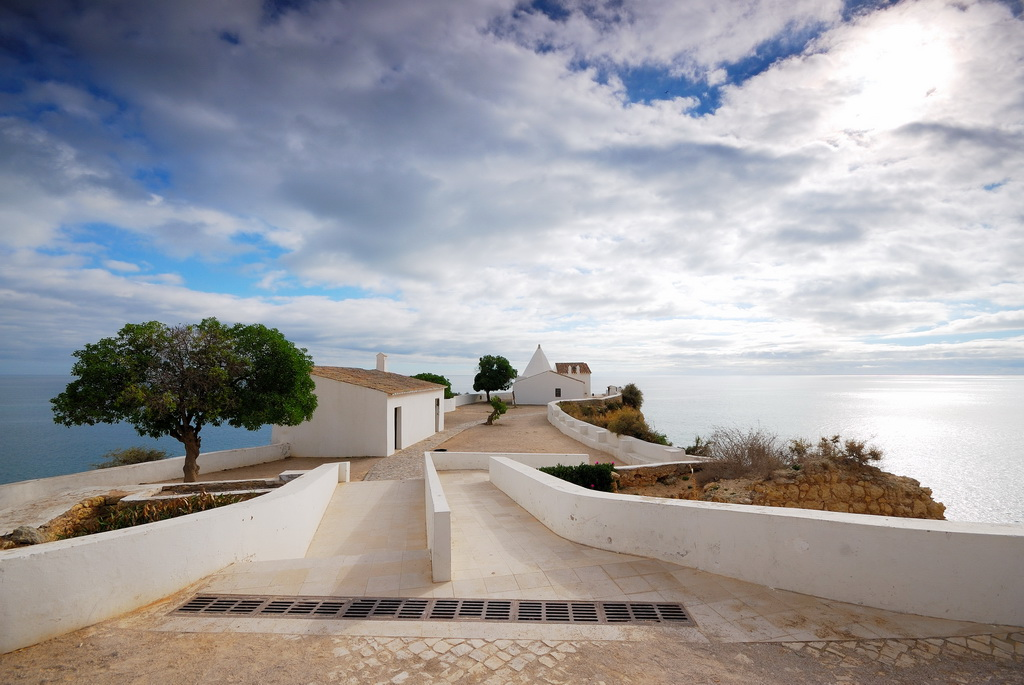
View of the Fort and Chapel of Our Lady of the Rock (Nossa Senhora da Rocha)

The coastal zone was, for centuries, attacked by barbary pirates and corsairs, and those responsible for public security erected various defensive structures along the coast, such as the fortresses of Nossa Senhora da Rocha, Carvoeiro and São João de Ferragudo, in addition to the lookouts and redoubts, such as the tower of Lapa or Marinha.

For a long period, Lagoa was governed within the municipality of Silves. On the 16 January 1773, a foral (charter) was issued by King Joseph I, incorporating the municipality of Lagoa, after its principal settlement (Lagoa) was elevated to the status of town (Portuguese: vila).

The local natural resources contributed to the current economic structure of the municipality, with agriculture (especially fruit and wine production), fishing, light industry and, later, tourism influencing the activities of the region. The fishing industry (in the communities of Ferragudo, Benagil, Carvoeiro and Senhora da Rocha), vineyards, and the traditional products of irrigated agriculture were the principal sources of wealth for the area until the 1970s. Driven by the abundance of fish, the canning and conserve industry at the beginning of the 20th century was responsible for an economic boom, that brought a general prosperity and wealth to the region.

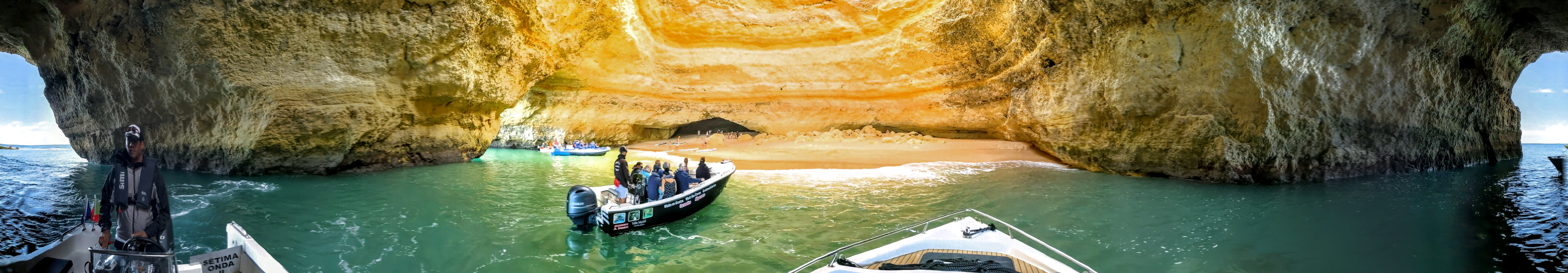
Natural grotto at Benagil (near Marinha Beach), where a large hole in the roof of the cave lets light in, a popular tourist attraction.

From the 1960s, however, tourism increasingly became the main driver of the area's economic development and creation of brand new infrastructure. This has brought an increase in job creation, its growth rapidly became the economic engine of the municipality, and it has now assumed a prominent place in the local economy. In parallel to the growth of tourism, the growth of all the related activities, especially in the construction industry, services, and commerce in general, resulted in the elevation of Lagoa to the status of city (cidade).

== Geography ==
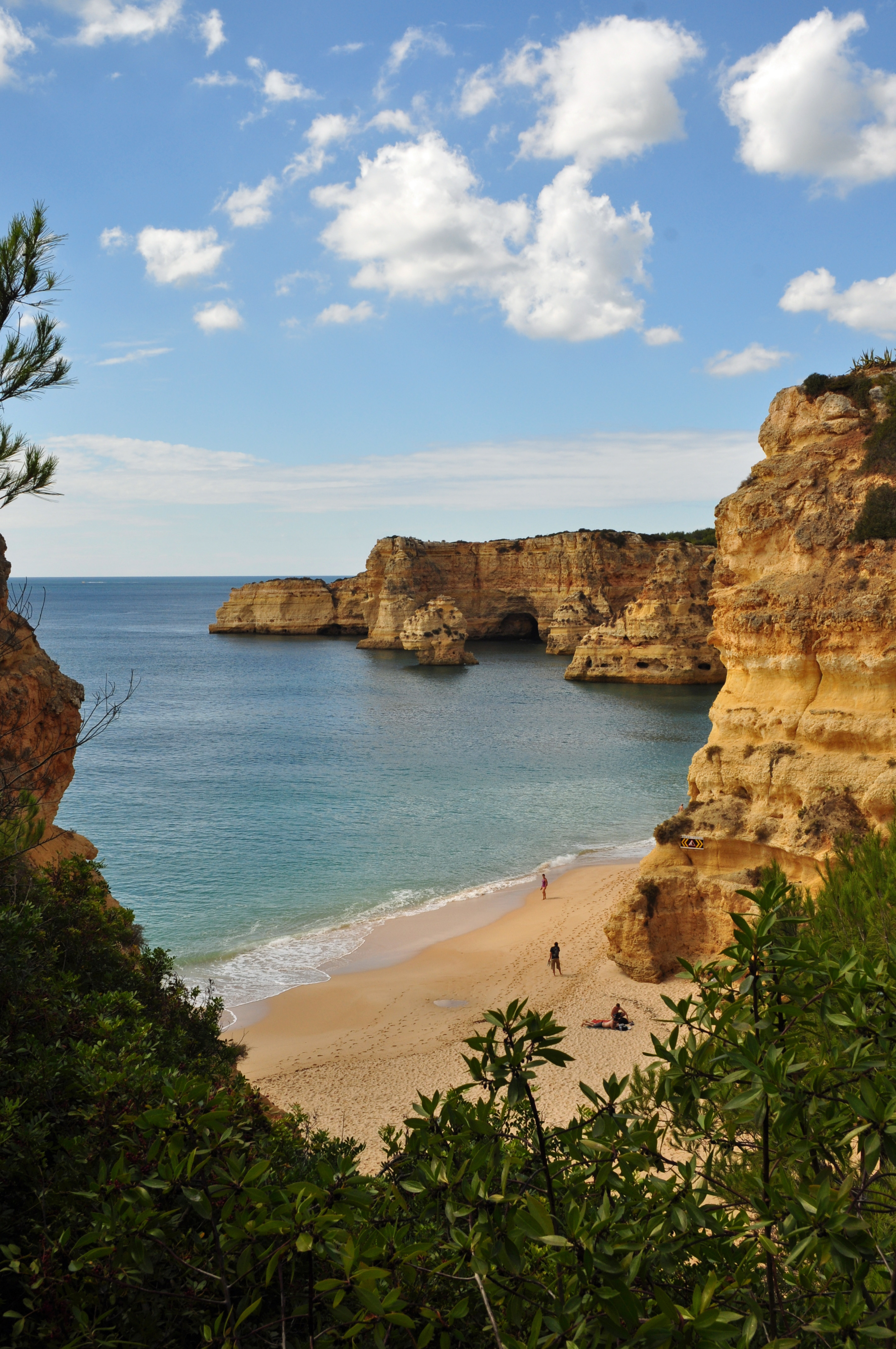
General view of the world-famous Marinha Beach, in Caramujeira, Lagoa, with the sea and rock outcroppings

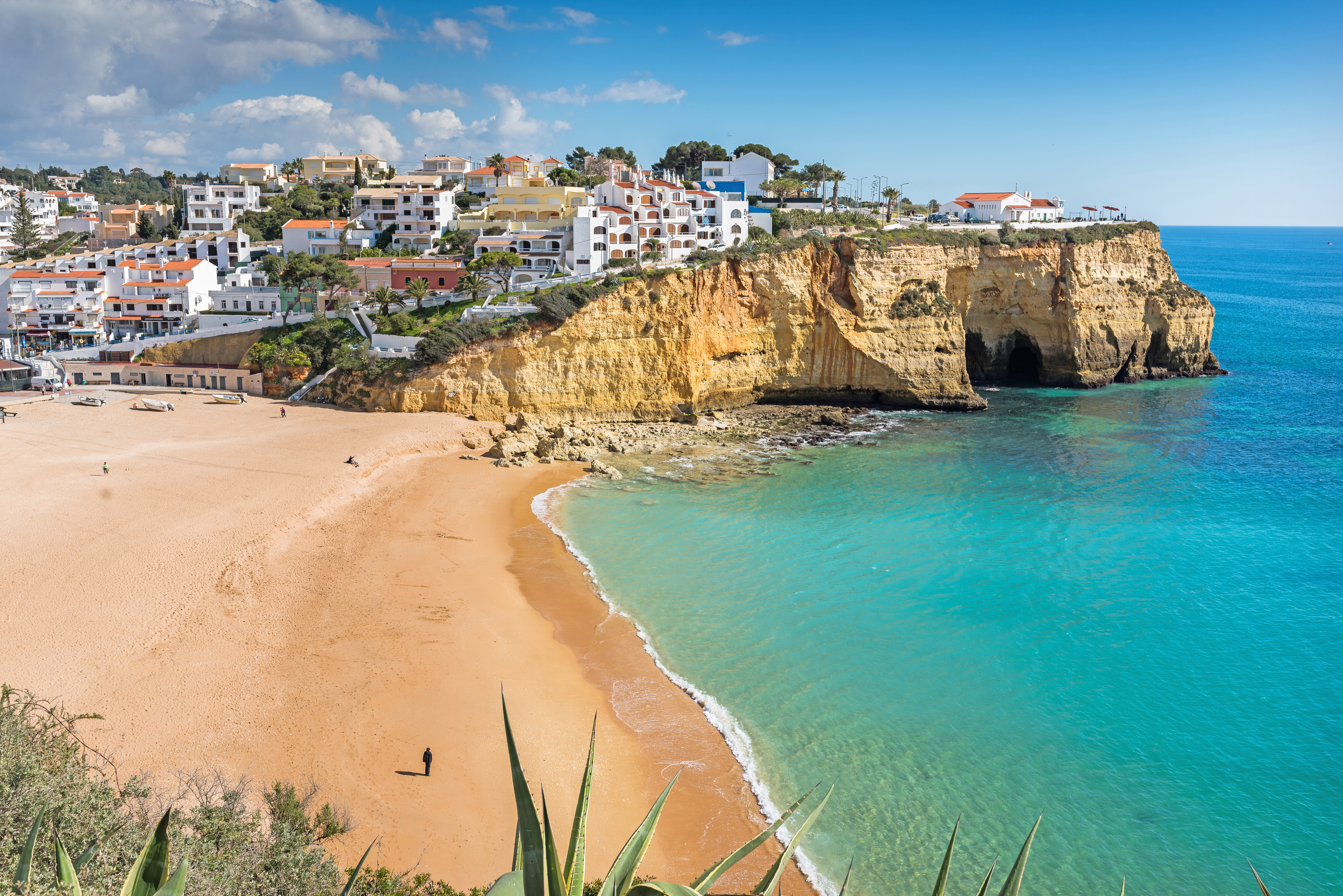
View of Carvoeiro (from the west)

=== Physical geography ===
Lagoa is bounded on the north and east by the municipality of Silves, west by Portimão, and fronts the Atlantic Ocean to the south. The city proper is about 35 to 59 meters above sea level, with most of it standing above 45 meters high.

Lagoa is a municipality rich in beaches. They have been improved dramatically over the last few decades, in terms of infrastructure and access, as well as in terms of water quality and the environment. They now successfully compete with the better known beaches of Portimão and Albufeira. The largest beaches are:

- Praia de Albandeira
- Praia da Angrinha
- Praia do Barranco
- Praia do Barranquinho
- Praia de Benagil
- Praia dos Beijinhos
- Praia dos Caneiros
- Praia do Carvalho
- Praia de Carvoeiro
- Praia da Corredoura
- Praia da Cova Redonda
- Praia de Ferragudo
- Praia Grande
- Praia da Malhada do Baraço
- Praia da Marinha
- Praia do Mato
- Praia da Mesquita
- Praia do Molhe
- Praia Nova
- Praia de Nossa Senhora da Rocha
- Praia do Pau
- Praia do Pintadinho
- Praia dos Tremoços
- Praia do Vale de Centeanes

=== Human geography ===
Population of Lagoa (1801 - 2011)
| Year | Pop. | ±% |
|---|---|---|
| 1801 | 4,913 | — |
| 1849 | 8,232 | +67.6% |
| 1900 | 12,135 | +47.4% |
| 1930 | 13,088 | +7.9% |
| 1960 | 13,846 | +5.8% |
| 1981 | 15,635 | +12.9% |
| 1991 | 16,780 | +7.3% |
| 2001 | 20,651 | +23.1% |
| 2011 | 22,975 | +11.3% |

The four civil parishes (Portuguese: freguesias) that provide local administrative control are:

- Estômbar e Parchal
- Ferragudo
- Lagoa e Carvoeiro
- Porches

All the civil parishes, excluding the city of Lagoa proper which is the seat of the entire municipality made of 4 civil parishes, have obtained the social designation of towns (Portuguese: vila), although they administratively govern a disperse region of rural-urban agglomerations.

== Economy ==
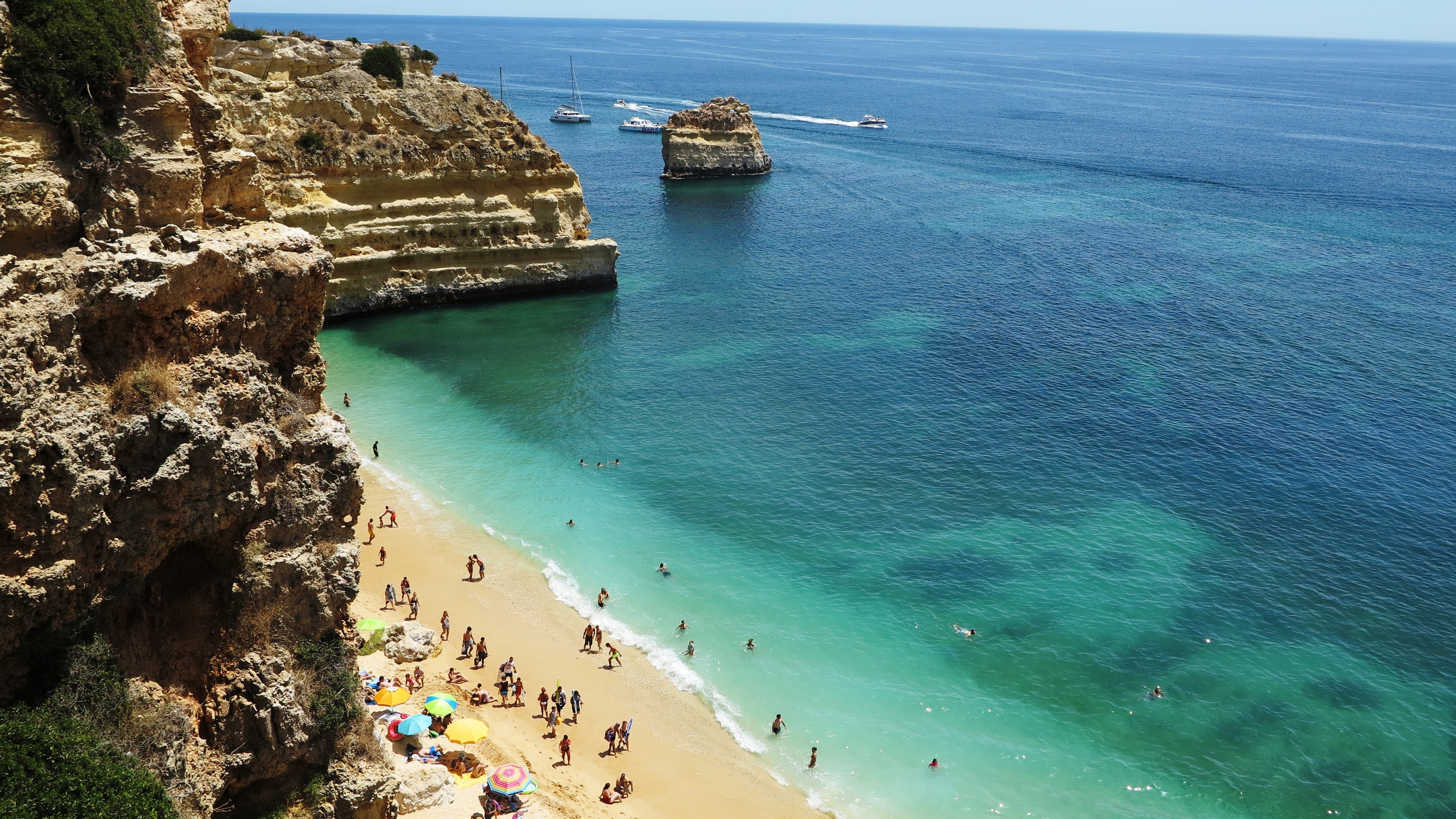
Scenic view of world-famous Marinha Beach, in Lagoa

Lagoa is one of the most important tourist areas of the Algarve. There are various factors which have contributed to its popularity, namely the variety of offerings to visitors (the beauty of its beaches, modern tourist accommodation, its golf courses and cultural heritage), orderly planning of land use within the municipality area (council area), its social stability, and the friendliness of its citizens. The city continues to improve facilities and organize events of interest to tourists.

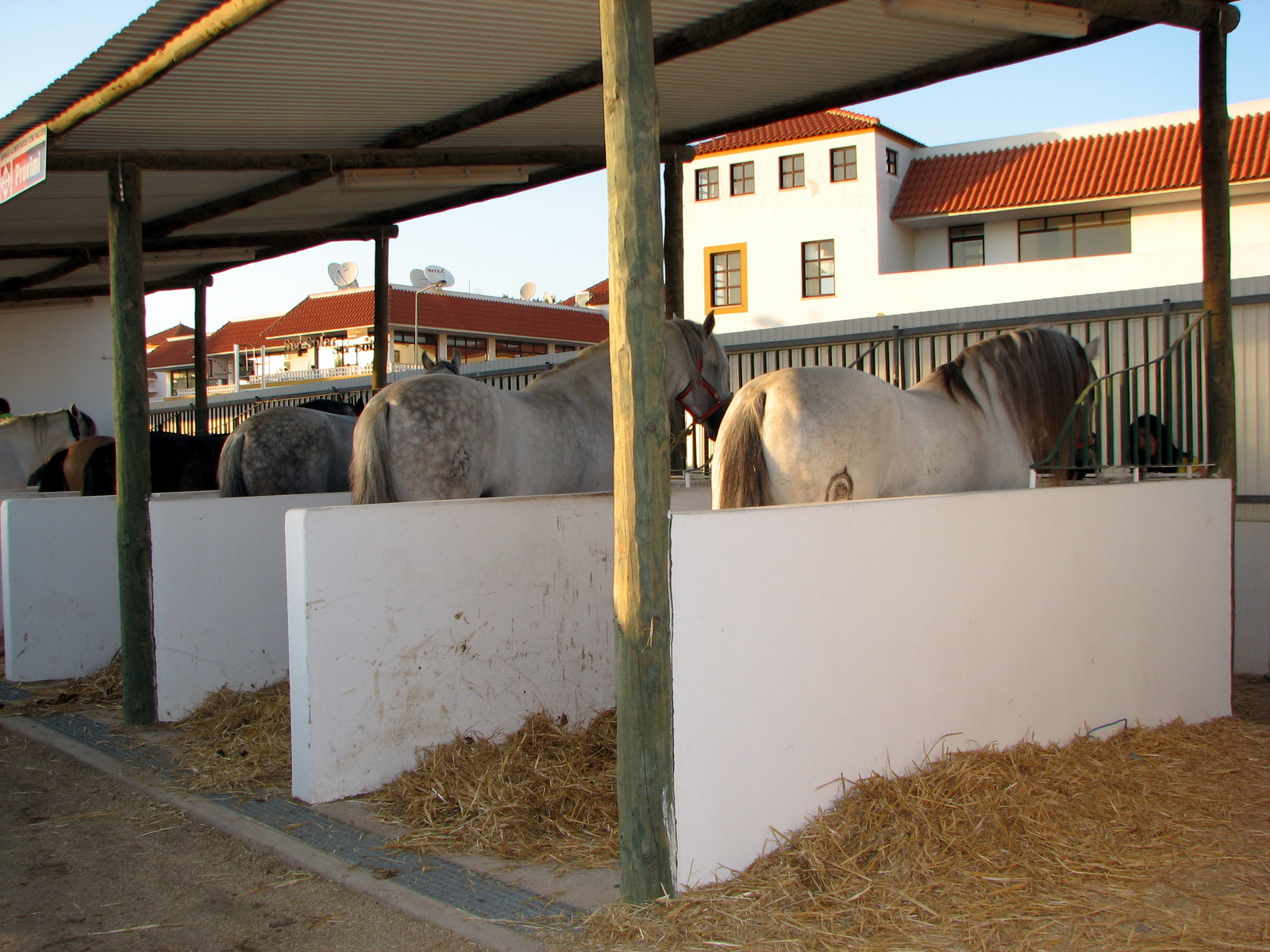
Horses at FATACIL - Craft, Tourism, Agricultural, Commercial and Industrial Fair of Lagoa

Each summer it hosts a large exhibition of craft products at the Parque de Feiras e Exposições de Lagoa (Fair and Exhibition Grounds of Lagoa), known by its official name's acronym FATACIL. Certain heritage buildings have been renovated for cultural uses in the city, notably the Municipal Library and the Convento de São José (St. Joseph Convent) – the Cultural Centre of the City of Lagoa – where various shows and a variety of exhibitions take place. Similarly the Municipal Auditorium hosts numerous shows and other events each week. Many cultural activities take place at the Parque Municipal de Fontes, north of Estômbar, all year round, including theatre, dances, and traditional folk-songs. In the 2000s and 2010s, Lagoa registered one of the highest levels of economic development in the Algarve. It has nowadays numerous supermarkets (ALDI, Auchan, Apolónia, Intermarché and Pingo Doce), medical offices, educational (elementary, secondary, music, art) institutions as well as sports, leisure and tourism facilities. Lagoa DOC is a Portuguese wine region centered around Lagoa municipality.

== Architecture ==
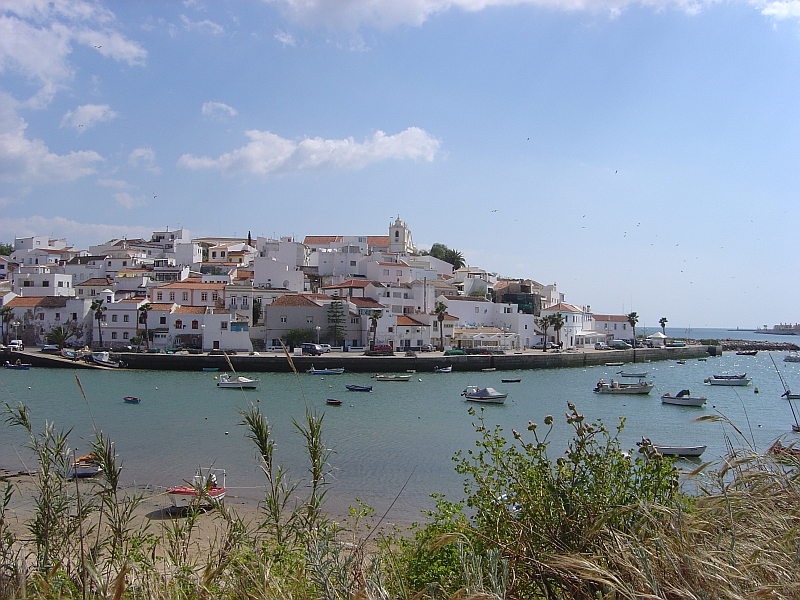
The clifftop residences of the parish of Ferragudo (near Portimão)

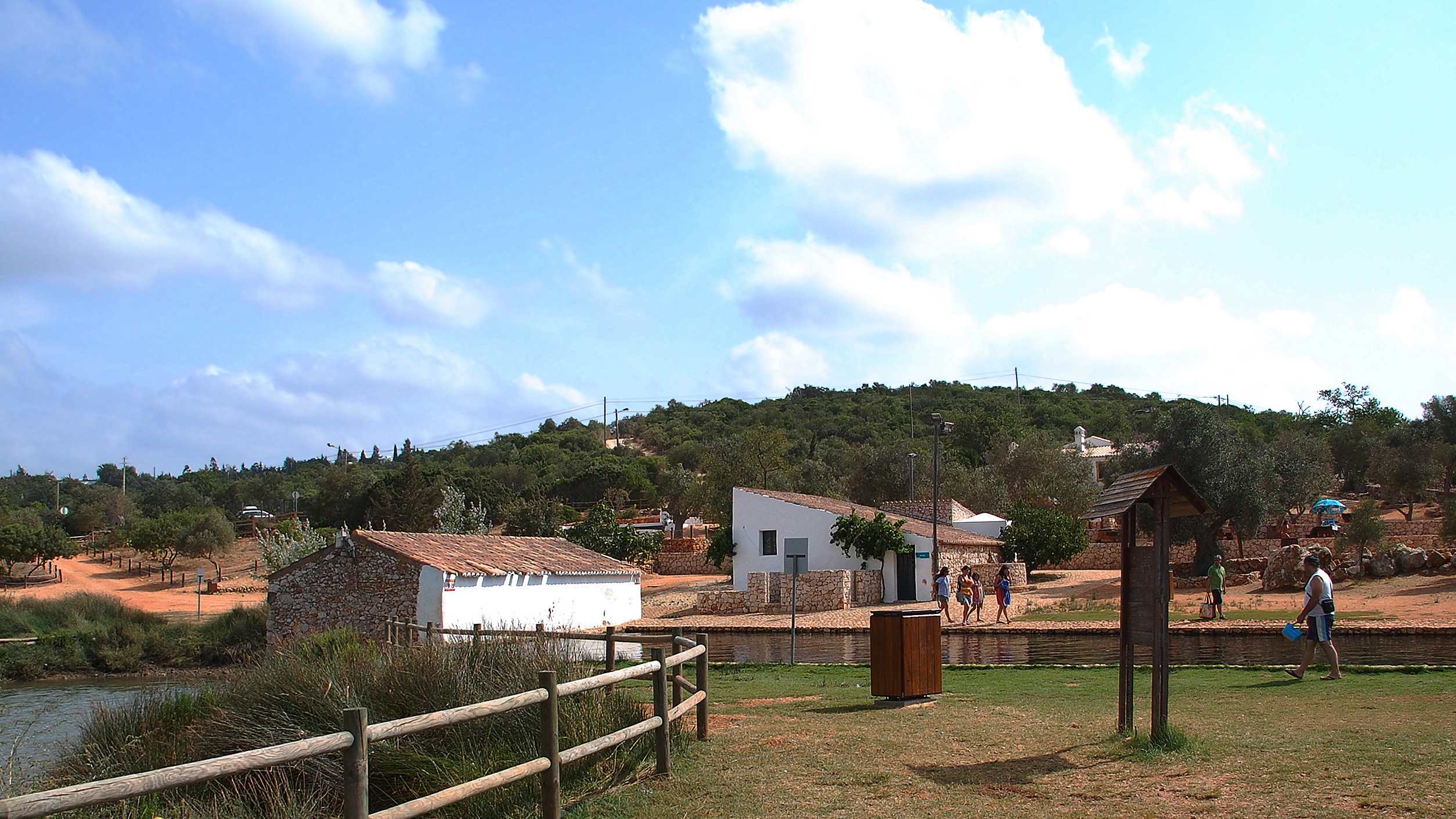
The Municipal Park of the Springs

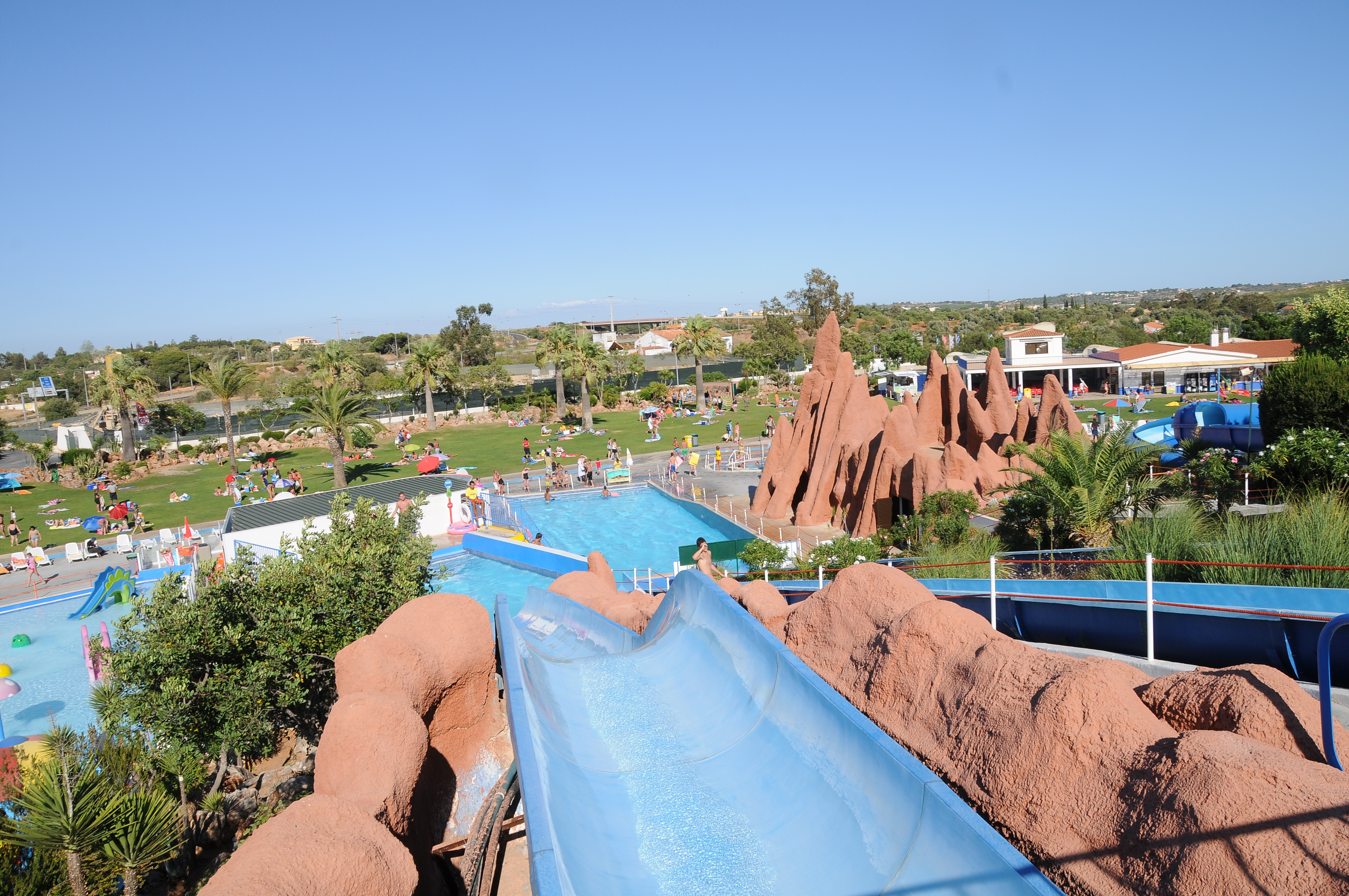
The Slide & Splash Park

=== Civic ===
- Congress Centre of Arade (Portuguese: Centro de Congressos do Arade)
- Lighthouse of Alfanzina (Portuguese: Farol de Alfanzina)
- Lighthouse of Ponta do Altar (Portuguese: Farol de Ponta do Altar)
- Railway Station of Lagoa (Portuguese: Estação Ferroviária de Lagoa / Estação Ferroviária de Estombar-Lagoa)

=== Military ===
- Castle of Estômbar / Castle of Abenabece (Portuguese: Castelo de Estômbar / Castelo de Abenabece)
- Fort of Our Lady of the Incarnation (Portuguese: Forte de Carvoeiro / Forte de Nossa Senhora da Encarnação)
- Fort of Our Lady of the Rock (Portuguese: Forte e Ermida de Nossa Senhora da Rocha), a medieval castle is situated in the civil parish of Porches, overlooking the cliffs of the parish; inside the fort is the Chapel of Nossa Senhora da Rocha, of uncertain date.
- Castle of Saint John of Arade / Fort of Saint John of Arade (Portuguese: Castelo de São João do Arade / Forte de São João do Arade)

=== Religious ===
- Church of Our Lady of Light (Portuguese: Igreja Matriz de Lagoa / Igreja de Nossa Senhora da Luz)
- Convent of Our Lady of Mount Carmel (Portuguese: Convento de Nossa Senhora do Carmo / Convento de Nossa Senhora do Socorro)
- Convent of Saint Joseph (Portuguese: Convento de São José)
- Convent of Saint Francis (Portuguese: Convento de São Francisco / Convento do Praxel / Convento do Parchal)
- Church of Saint James the Great (Portuguese: Igreja Matriz de Estômbar / Igreja São Tiago Maior)
- Church of Our Lady of Incarnation (Portuguese: Igreja Matriz de Porches / Igreja de Nossa Senhora da Encarnação), the 16th century church of the Encarnation, is a Baroque-era temple that includes vaulted-ceiling decorated in azulejo tile, and gilded chancel;
- Church of Our Lady of Conception (Portuguese: Igreja Matriz de Ferragudo / Igreja de Nossa Senhora da Conceição)
- Church of Mercy of Lagoa (Portuguese: Igreja da Misericórdia de Lagoa)
- Church of Mercy of Estômbar (Portuguese: Igreja da Misericórdia de Estômbar)
- Hermitage of Saint Antony (Portuguese: Ermida de Santo António da Mexilhoeira da Carregação)
- Holy Well (Portuguese: Poço Santo / Poço Santo de Nossa Senhora)

== Notable people ==
- Remexido (1796–1838) a notorious guerrilla leader of the Algarve
- Hermínio da Palma Inácio (1922–2009) a Portuguese revolutionary against the Salazar dictatorship and airplane hijacker
- Vasco Joaquim Rocha Vieira (born 1939) a retired Portuguese Army officer, the last Governor of Macau

== See also ==
- Craft, Tourism, Agricultural, Commercial and Industrial Fair of Lagoa
- Lagoa DOC
- Rádio Lagoa
