= Lagoa =

Lagoa (Portuguese for lagoon) may refer to the following:

== People ==
- Barbara Lagoa, Cuban-American federal judge

== Places ==
=== Brazil ===
- Campina da Lagoa, Paraná
- Lagoa, Paraíba, Paraíba
- Lagoa, Rio de Janeiro, a quarter of Rio de Janeiro
- Lagoa Alegre, Piauí
- Lagoa d'Anta, Rio Grande do Norte
- Lagoa do Barro do Piauí, Piauí
- Lagoa da Canoa, Alagoas
- Lagoa do Carro, Pernambuco
- Lagoa da Conceição, in the city of Florianópolis, Santa Catarina state
- Lagoa da Confusão, Tocantins
- Lagoa de Dentro, Paraíba
- Lagoa Dourada, Minas Gerais
- Lagoa Formosa, Minas Gerais
- Lagoa dos Gatos, Pernambuco
- Lagoa Grande, Minas Gerais
- Lagoa Grande, Pernambuco
- Lagoa Grande do Maranhão, Maranhão
- Lagoa do Itaenga, Pernambuco
- Manguaba Lagoon, Alagoas
- Lagoa do Mato, Maranhão
- Lagoa do Mato, Ceará
- Lagoa Mirim, Rio Grande do Sul
- Mundaú Lagoon, Alagoas
- Lagoa Nova, Rio Grande do Norte
- Lagoa do Ouro, Pernambuco
- Lagoa dos Patos, Rio Grande do Sul
- Lagoa de Pedras, Rio Grande do Norte
- Lagoa do Piauí, Piauí
- Lagoa da Prata, Minas Gerais
- Lagoa Real, Bahia
- Lagoa Salgada, Rio Grande do Norte
- Lagoa Santa, Goiás
- Lagoa Santa, Minas Gerais
- Lagoa de São Francisco, Piauí
- Lagoa Seca, Paraíba
- Lagoa do Sítio, Piauí
- Lagoa do Tocantins, Tocantins
- Lagoa dos Três Cantos, Rio Grande do Sul
- Lagoa de Velhos, Rio Grande do Norte
- Lagoa Vermelha, Rio Grande do Sul
- São João da Lagoa, Minas Gerais
- São José da Lagoa Tapada, Paraíba
- São Sebastião de Lagoa de Roça, Paraíba
- Sete Lagoas, Minas Gerais
- Três Lagoas, Mato Grosso do Sul

=== Cape Verde ===
- Lagoa, Cape Verde, a settlement on the island of Maio

=== Indonesia ===
- Lagoa (North Jakarta), a village in Koja subdistrict

=== Portugal ===
- Lagoa, Algarve, a municipality in the Algarve
  - Lagoa e Carvoeiro, a civil parish in the municipality of Lagoa, Algarve
- Lagoa de Óbidos, a lagoon in the municipalities of Óbidos and Caldas da Rainha
- Lagoa Beach, a beach in the municipality of Póvoa de Varzim

==== Azores ====
- Lagoa (Azores), a municipality on the island of São Miguel
- Lagoa do Fogo, a crater lake, on the island of São Miguel
