= Lagoa do Mato =

Lagoa do Mato may refer to:

== District ==
- Lagoa do Mato, Ceará, district in the state of Ceará.

== Municipality ==
- Lagoa do Mato, municipality in the state of Maranhão.

== Windfarm ==
- Windfarm Lagoa do Mato, car wind power the state of Ceará.
