= Caramujeira =

Hamlet in Algarve, Portugal

Coordinates: 37.1023943°N 8.4134959°W

- Hamlet
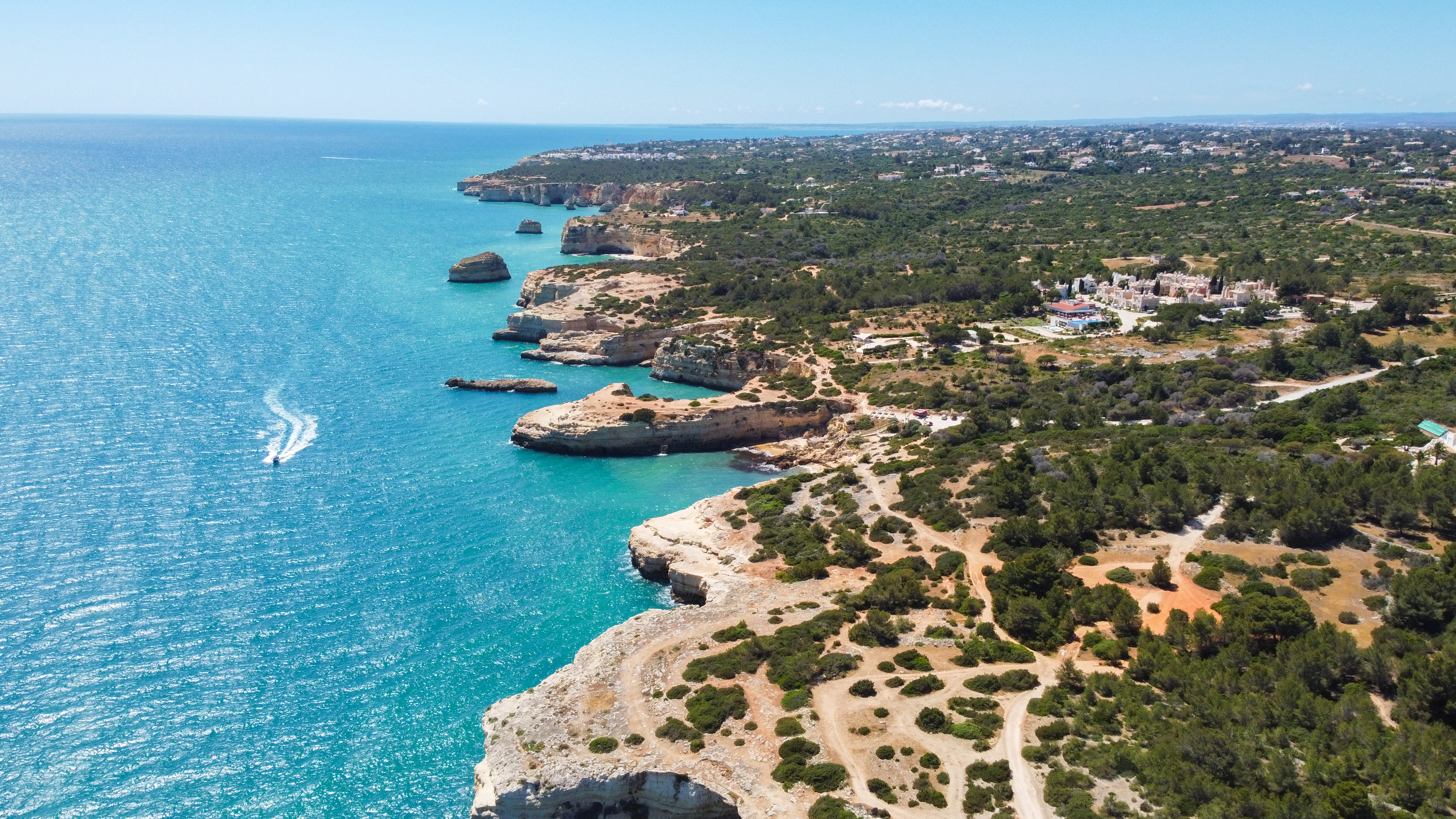
- Coastal aerial view of Caramujeira in the Algarve
- Interactive map of Caramujeira
- Country: Portugal
- Civil Parish: Lagoa and Carvoeiro
- Municipality: Lagoa
- Region: Algarve
- Postal code: 8400-403 Lagoa

Caramujeira is a hamlet in Portugal, located in the civil parish of Lagoa and Carvoeiro, on the outskirts of the city of Lagoa, in the Algarve region. It became well known for its Marinha Beach, considered by the Michelin Guide as "one of the 10 most beautiful beaches in Europe" and "as one of the 100 most beautiful beaches in the world". In 2018, CNN rated the Marinha Beach as one of the "best beaches in the world". Caramujeira is also known for its wine production.

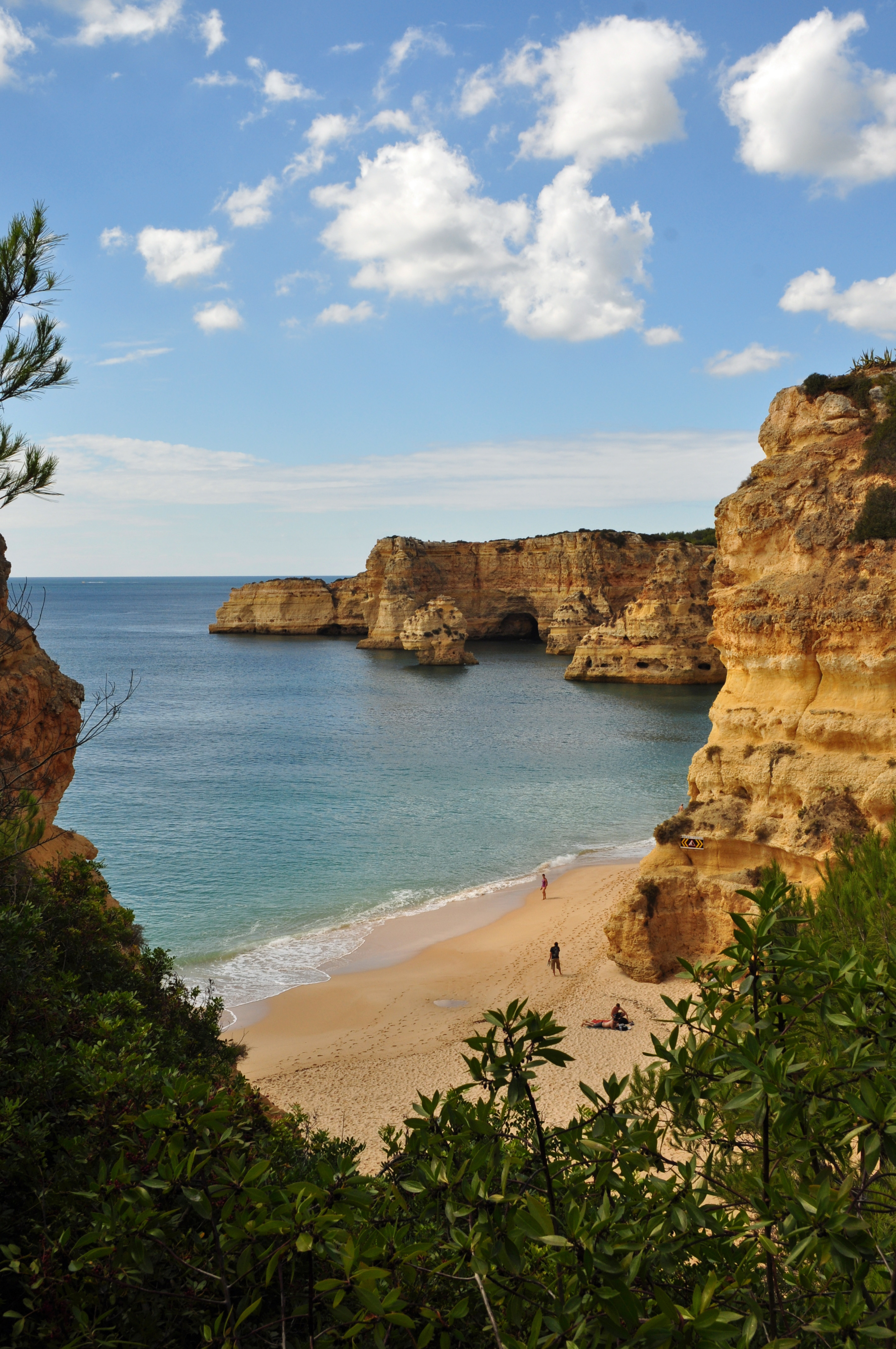
Marinha Beach, in Caramujeira, near the city of Lagoa, in Algarve region, Portugal.

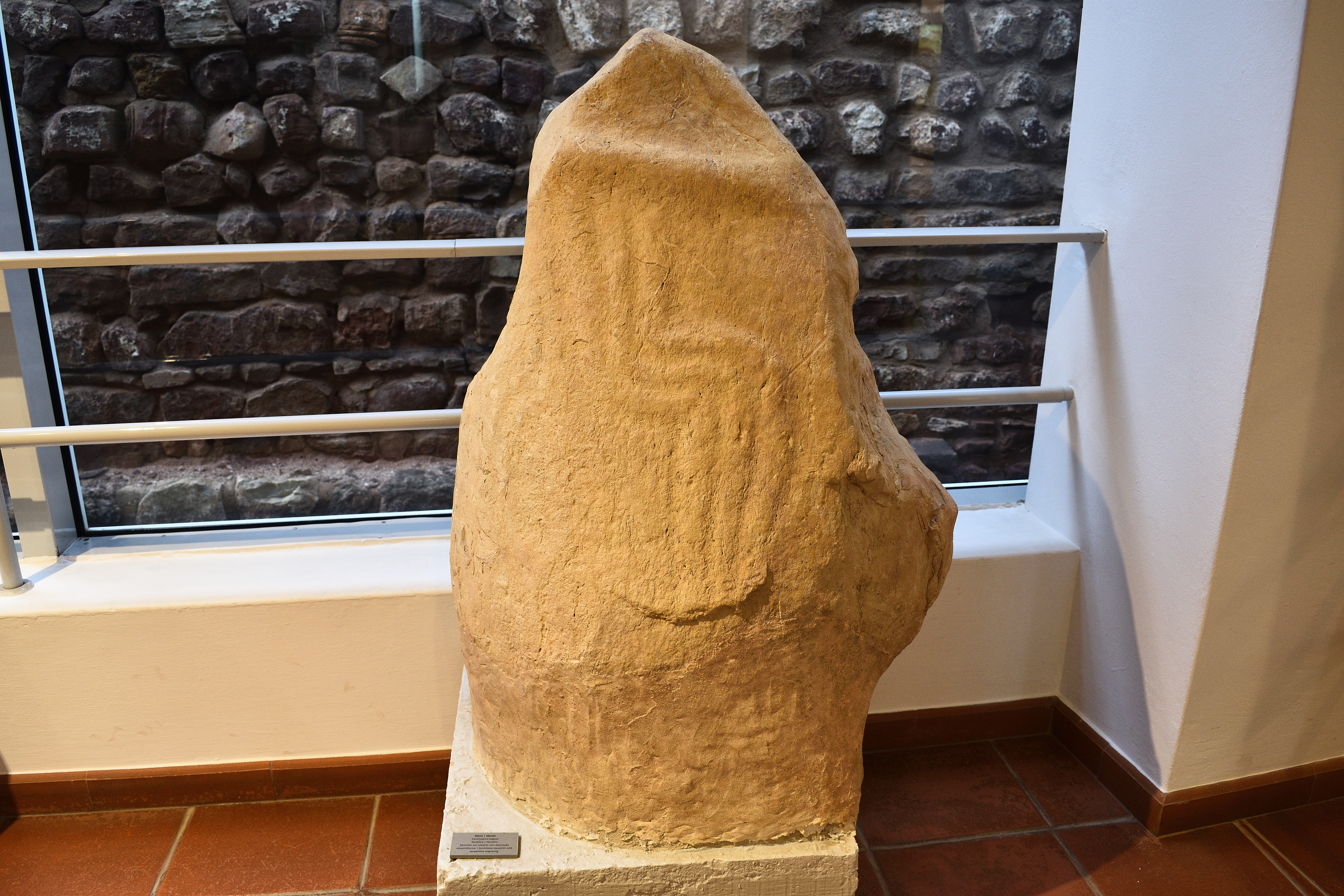
The Menhir of Caramujeira, currently preserved and on display at the Silves Municipal Archeology Museum.

Benagil, Carvoeiro and Porches villages are located near the hamlet.

== See also ==
- Carvoeiro
- Lagoa, Algarve
- Tourism in Portugal
