= Lagoa Parish =

Lagoa Parish may refer to:

- Lagoa Parish, Lagoa, Algarve
- Lagoa Parish, Macedo de Cavaleiros in Macedo de Cavaleiros
- Lagoa Parish, Vila Nova de Famalicão, in Vila Nova de Famalicão
