= Várzea Alegre =

Municipality in Ceará, Brazil

Coordinates: 6.78889°S 39.2958°W

- Municipality
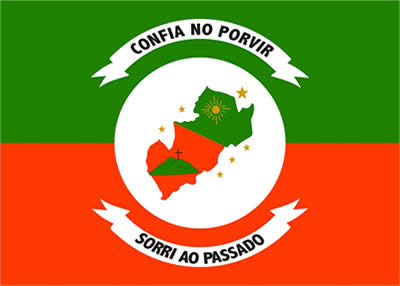
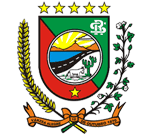
- Flag Coat of arms
- Interactive map of Várzea Alegre
- Country: Brazil
- Region: Nordeste
- State: Ceará
- Mesoregion: Centro-Sul Cearense

Population (2020)
  - Total: 40,903
- Time zone: UTC−3 (BRT)

Várzea Alegre is a municipality in the state of Ceará in the Northeast region of Brazil. Its area is 835.706 km^{2}, including the Calabaça (pumpkin), Canindezinho, Ibicatu, Naraniú and Lagoa Verde (green lagoon) districts.

== History ==
There is little information on the early settlement of Várzea Alegre. Pioneer explorers of the region saw the valley on the dangerous walk towards Cariri and named it Várzea Alegre after the floodplain or lowland where the city is located. It is one of the few cities in Ceará that has never changed its name. On October 10, 1870, Provincial Law No. 1.329 established the municipality.

Várzea Alegre was separated from Lavras da Mangabeira, previously part of Cedro, in November 1863. The city's assets consisted of a patch of land, donated by Major Joaquim Alves Bezerra, his wife and others, on October 19. The local parish was established on November 30, 1863. According to tradition, the church of São Raimundo Nonato was built by the sons of Raimundo Bezerra, known as "Father Raymond".

Várzea Alegre is known as the "Land of Contrasts". Those contrasts have inspired songs like Luiz Gonzaga's "Contrastes de Várzea Alegre", with lyrics by the composer José Clementino.

== Geography ==
Located 290 miles from Fortaleza, Várzea Alegre has an area of 81,120 km^{2} and a population of 40,903. Annual income per capita is R$325.85, the 79th highest in the state. The high concentration of wealth is such that more than half the population must survive on a monthly income of less than half the minimum wage. The municipality has a population density of 42.95 inhabitants per km^{2}. Urbanization is 55.30% (19,268 inhabitants in the urban area) and increasing.

Natural resources include soil, water and vegetation favoring agricultural development, but the city has never had a policy of land recovery and constantly finds itself plagued by drought, forcing people to seek survival in urban areas.

The climate of Várzea Alegre is semi-arid and does not vary greatly. The average temperature is 27 °C and average annual rainfall is 965.3 mm. The rainy season generally begins in January and continues until June. Drought sometimes occurs.

=== Hydrography ===
The main streams are the Machado, São Miguel, and the Riacho do Meio (Middle Creek) and its tributaries the Mocotó, Caiana, Feijão and Umari dos Carlos, irrigating the entire territory and serving as natural boundaries between Cedro and Lavras da Mangabeira.

The following water sources serve the municipality:

- Main dams: Caraíbas, Riacho Verde, Lagoa Seca, Vacaria, Mameluco, Brejo, Olho D'água and Ubaldinho.
- Main reservoirs: Fortuna and Cachoeira Dantas.
- Main lagoons: Lagoa de São Raimundo, Lagoa de Iputi, Lagoa dos Nunes, Lagoa de Dentro.

== Culture ==
The main cultural events are:

- Várzea Alegre Carnival
- Holy Week
- Festas Juninas (June)
- São Raimundo Nonato Week (August)
- Week of the Municipality (October)
- Christmas of Peace (December)

== See also ==
- List of municipalities in Ceará
