= Serra da Boa Vista, Ceará =

Mountain in Brasil

Serra da Boa Vista
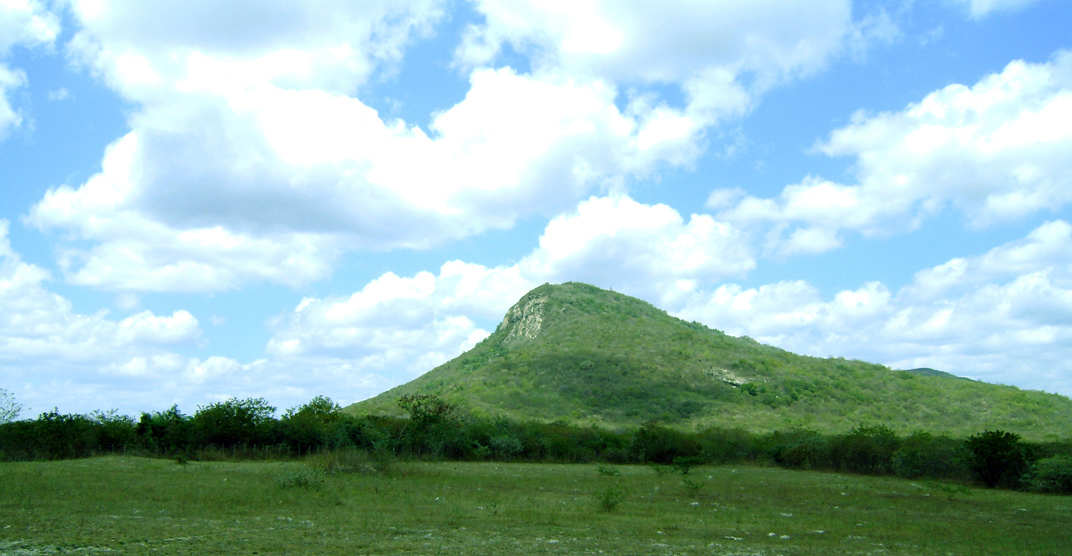
- The mountain view from the field in 2009

Highest point
- Elevation: 621 m (2,037 ft)
- Coordinates: 4°41′01″S 39°39′27″W

Geography
- Location: Itatira, Ceará, Brazil

The Serra da Boa Vista is a mountain located in the central interior of Ceará. It is located in the municipality of Itatira with a long-distance view and lush landscapes of the semi-arid region, thus named Serra da Boa Vista.

== Location ==
This mountain is 176 km from the capital of Ceará, Fortaleza, 17 km from the city of Itatira (headquarters) and 4 km from Lagoa do Mato, district Itatira.

With approximately 621 m in height, 2,037 feet, prominence of 492 m and 4.5 km long, it became one of the most famous mountains in the region.

== Tourist route ==
Like many other civilizations that have always been curious about their particular means of natural and social conviviality, the people of Itatira, the itatirenses, also had some curiosity to get to the top of the mountain ranges of the area as the city of Itatira had large numbers of mountain, known also as a mountainous region in central interior of Ceará. And saw that there was a water hole, a spring, which was the main reason of the first people to climb. From generation to generation, the Serra da Boa Vista was always seen as a great place to visit and even today, young and old climb even in as a mountain sport.

== Climate and vegetation ==
The climate is tropical, hot and semi-arid. The typical vegetation is tropical rain forest, or seasonally dry forest.

== See also ==
- Brazilian Institute of Environment and Renewable Natural Resources
- Foundation Cearense for Meteorology and Water Management
- Geography of Brazil
