= Fort of Our Lady of the Incarnation (Carvoeiro) =

Small fortification in Carvoeiro, Lagoa, Portugal

- Forte de Nossa Senhora da Encarnação
- Faro, Algarve, Algarve in Portugal
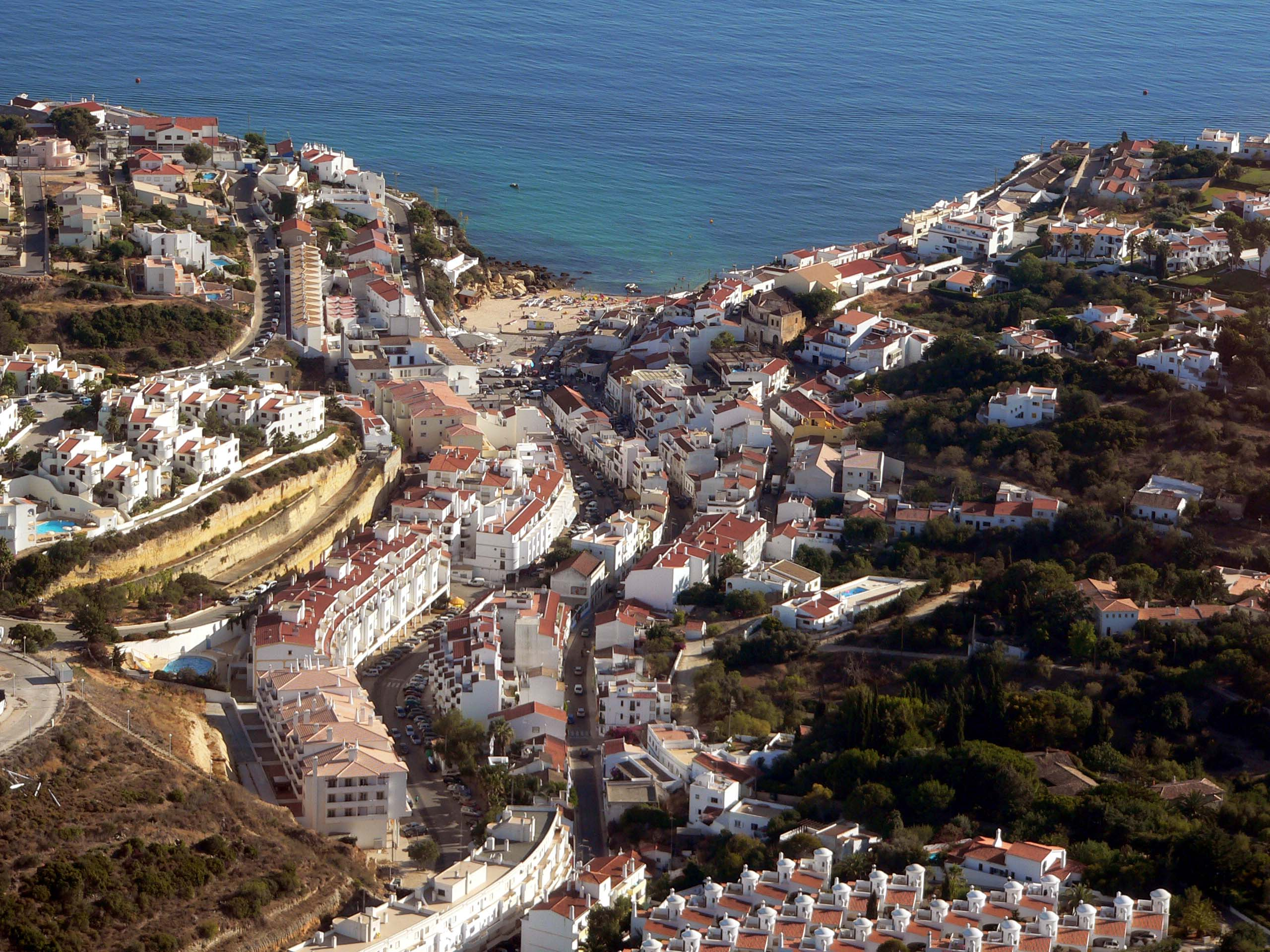
- The Fort of Carvoeiro, located on the southern coast of the Algarve (top left-hand corner)

Site information
- Type: Fort
- Owner: Portuguese Republic
- Operator: Roman Catholic Diocese of Faro
- Open to the public: Public

Location
- Location of the fort in the municipality of Lagoa
- Coordinates: 37°5′40.85″N 8°28′14.57″W

Site history
- Built: c. 1670

The Fort of Our Lady of the Incarnation (Portuguese: Forte de Nossa Senhora da Encarnação) is a small fortification in the civil parish of Carvoeiro, municipality of Lagoa, in Portuguese Algarve.

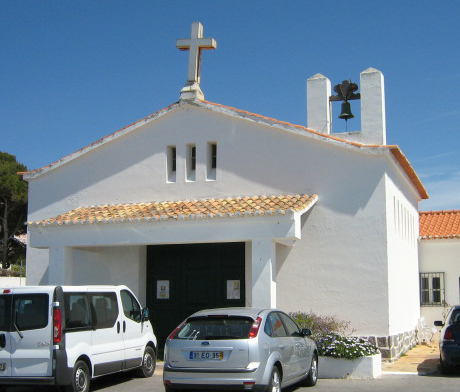
The single-nave Hermitage of Our Lady of the Incarnation within the courtyard of the fortification

== Architecture ==
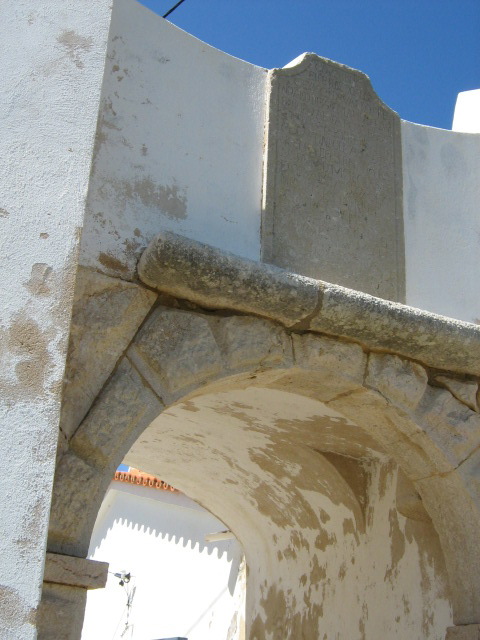
Exterior of fort gate

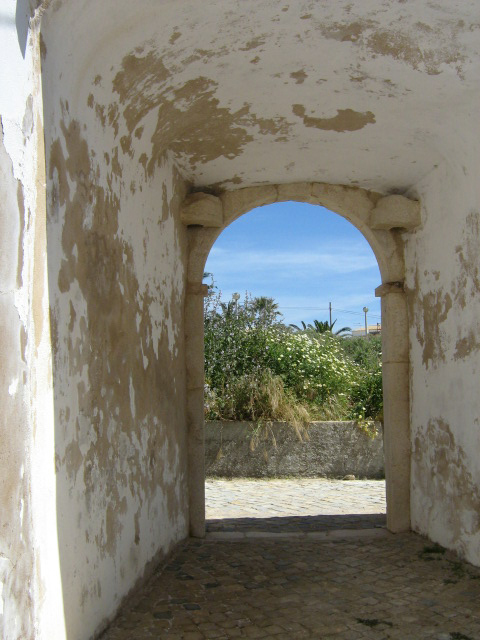
Interior of fort gate

It is not known when the shrine was built in the interior of an entrenched polygonal-plan fortification, built to protect the populace from frequent assaults and plundering by pirates.

The shrine is a depository for two images: of the patron saint (Our Lady of the Incarnation) dating to the 17th century; and the Crucifixion, attributed in the 19th century.
