= Carvoeiro (Lagoa) =

- Civil parish
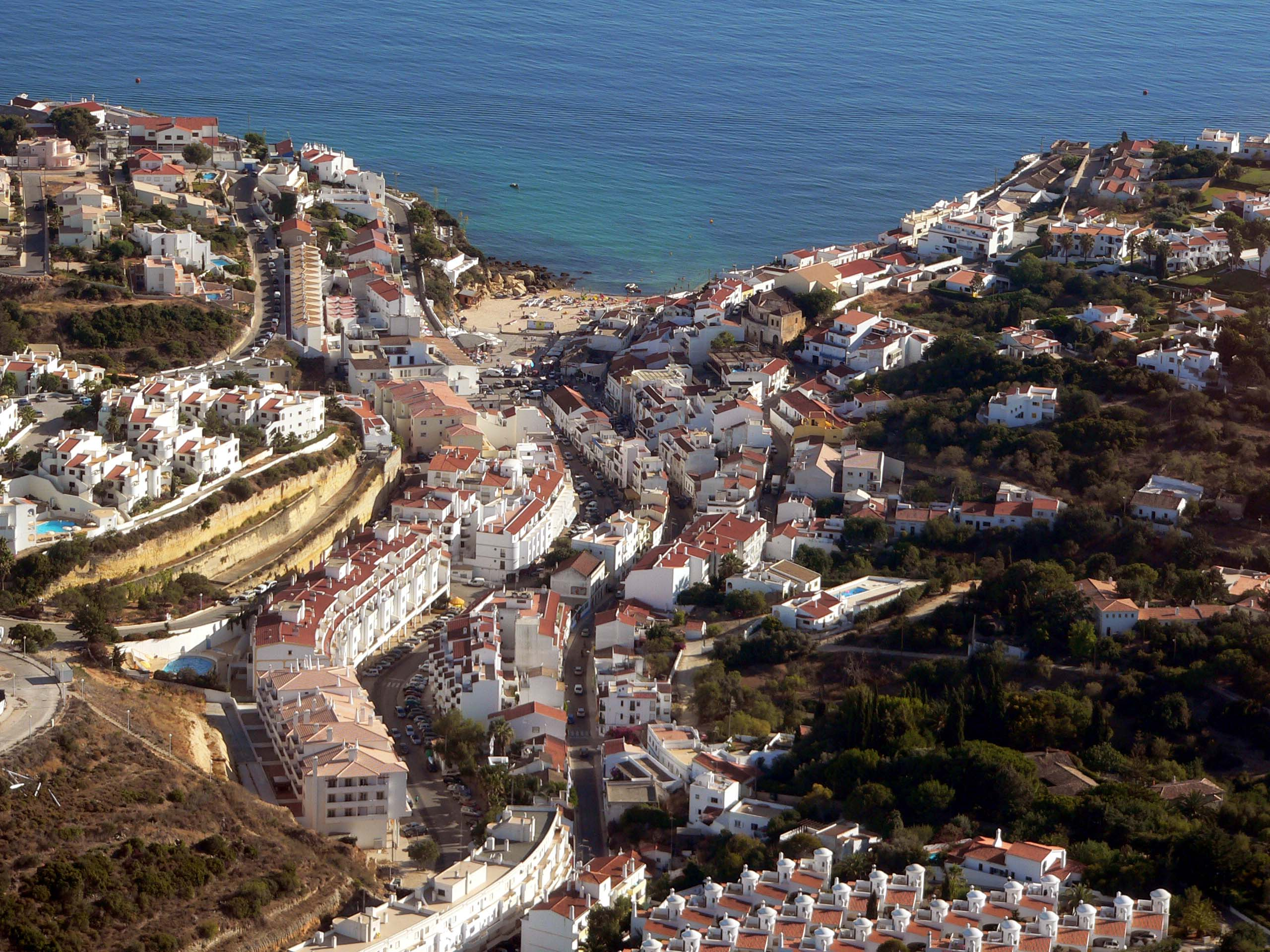

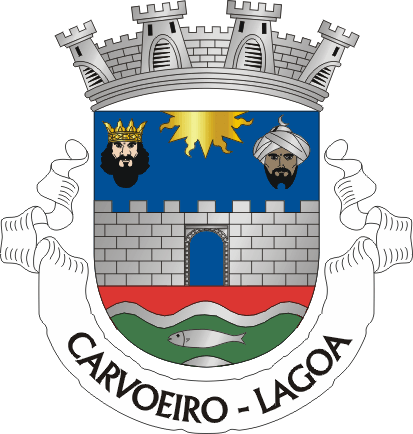
- Coat of arms

- Location in Portugal
- Coordinates: 37°06′N 08°28′W
- Country: Portugal
- Region: Algarve
- Intermunic. comm.: Algarve
- District: Faro
- Municipality: Lagoa
- Disbanded: 2013

Area
  - Total: 11.66 km^{2} (4.50 sq mi)

Population (2011)
  - Total: 2,721
  - Density: 233.4/km^{2} (604.4/sq mi)
- Time zone: UTC+00:00 (WET)
  - Summer (DST): UTC+01:00 (WEST)
- Postal code: 8400-508
- Area code: 282
- Patron: Nossa Senhora da Encarnação

Carvoeiro is a town and a former civil parish in the municipality (concelho) of Lagoa, Algarve, Portugal. In 2013, the parish merged into the new civil parish Lagoa e Carvoeiro. The population in 2011 was 2,721, in an area of 11.66 km². It is located about 5 kilometres (3.1 mi) south of Lagoa.

As a traditional fishing village, Carvoeiro has maintained its authenticity while adapting to the needs of an increasing number of tourists. Despite its popularity, the town remains relatively underserved by public transport, with the closest train station being Estombar-Lagoa.

There are two beaches at Carvoeiro: Carvoeiro Beach (Praia de Carvoeiro) and Paradise Beach (Praia do Paraíso).

== History ==
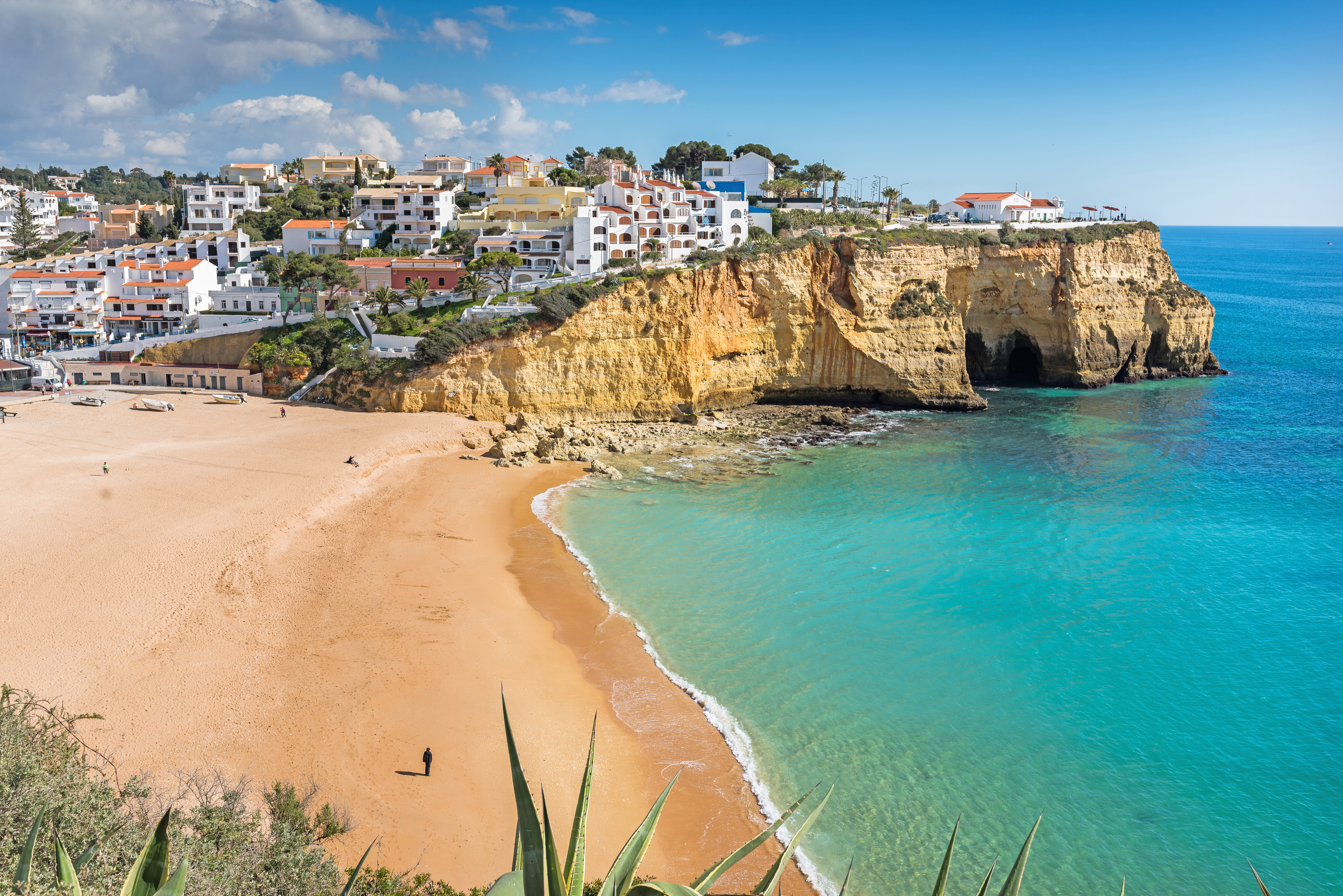
View of Carvoeiro (from the west)

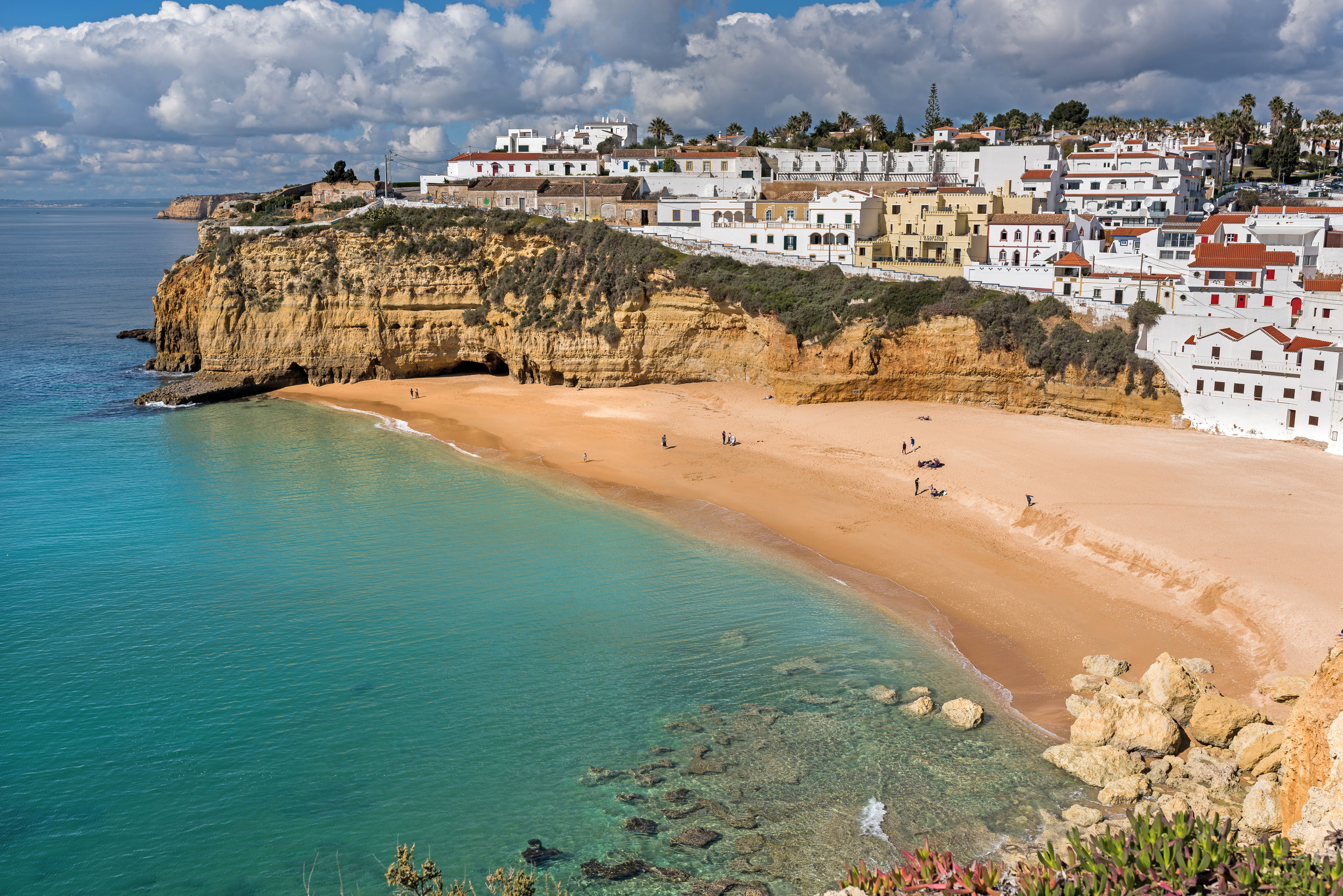
View of Carvoeiro (from the east)

Formed from a picturesque fishing village, with a long history of settlement, the parish slowly developed into a tourist area in the municipality of Lagoa, owing to its number of sand beaches protected by cliffs. There are vestiges of human settlement dating to the Roman occupation of the peninsula, as well as of early naval activity in the area.

The region was historically unspared by frequent pirate and military assaults along the coast, where a number of naval battles occurred. Most notably, in 1544, a squadron of ships under D. Pedro da Cunha battled the Turkish barbary coast pirate Xarramet.

According to historical records, the earliest settlement was called Caboiere, an old name for a hamlet of fishermen from the Islamic-medieval period. For most of the community's history, fishing has been the mainstay of the local economy.

Since the 1960s, however, tourism has gradually become the area's economic base, and many hotels, apartment complexes, shops, and roads and other types of infrastructure have been built to attract visitors. An insight into the effects of mass tourism on the Algarve, focused on Carvoeiro, was written by Patrick Swift, describing what the community was like before that time. Swift was an artist and long-time resident of Carvoeiro who founded Porches Pottery.

Carvoeiro became a separate/independent parish in 1985 and was raised to the status of a town on 19 April 2001.

== Geography ==
Algar Seco, a few hundred meters along the coast east of the main square and beach, is a popular nature site where ocean wave erosion has carved out grottoes, islets and water-spouts. It is also renowned in the vicinity as a prime location for spotting marine life. In 2011, a blue whale (Balaenoptera musculus) was sighted off the coastline by local fishermen, but more commonly, bottlenose dolphins (Tursiops aduncus) are seen in pods of up to 12.

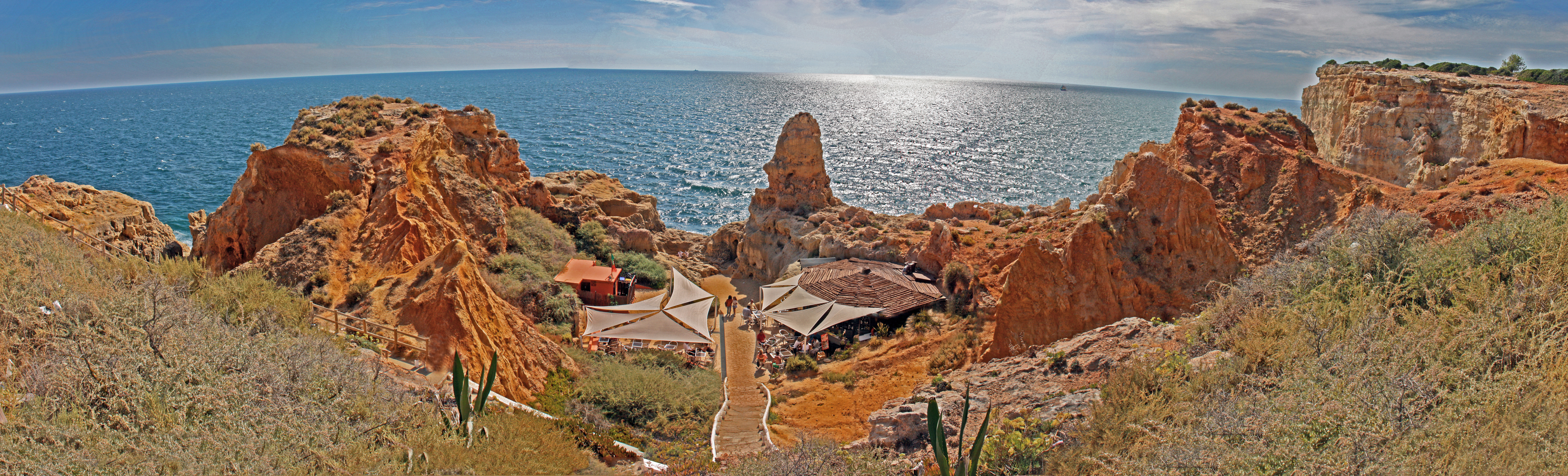
Panorama of the rock formations of Algar Seco near Carvoeiro

== Architecture ==
To the west of the town is the site of an old ruined fort, ordered built in 1670 as part of the coastal defenses of the Algarve. Only a gate survives. At the same site is the Shrine of Our Lady of the Incarnation, a chapel overlooking the sea, whose construction is said to have antedated the fort.

=== Civic ===
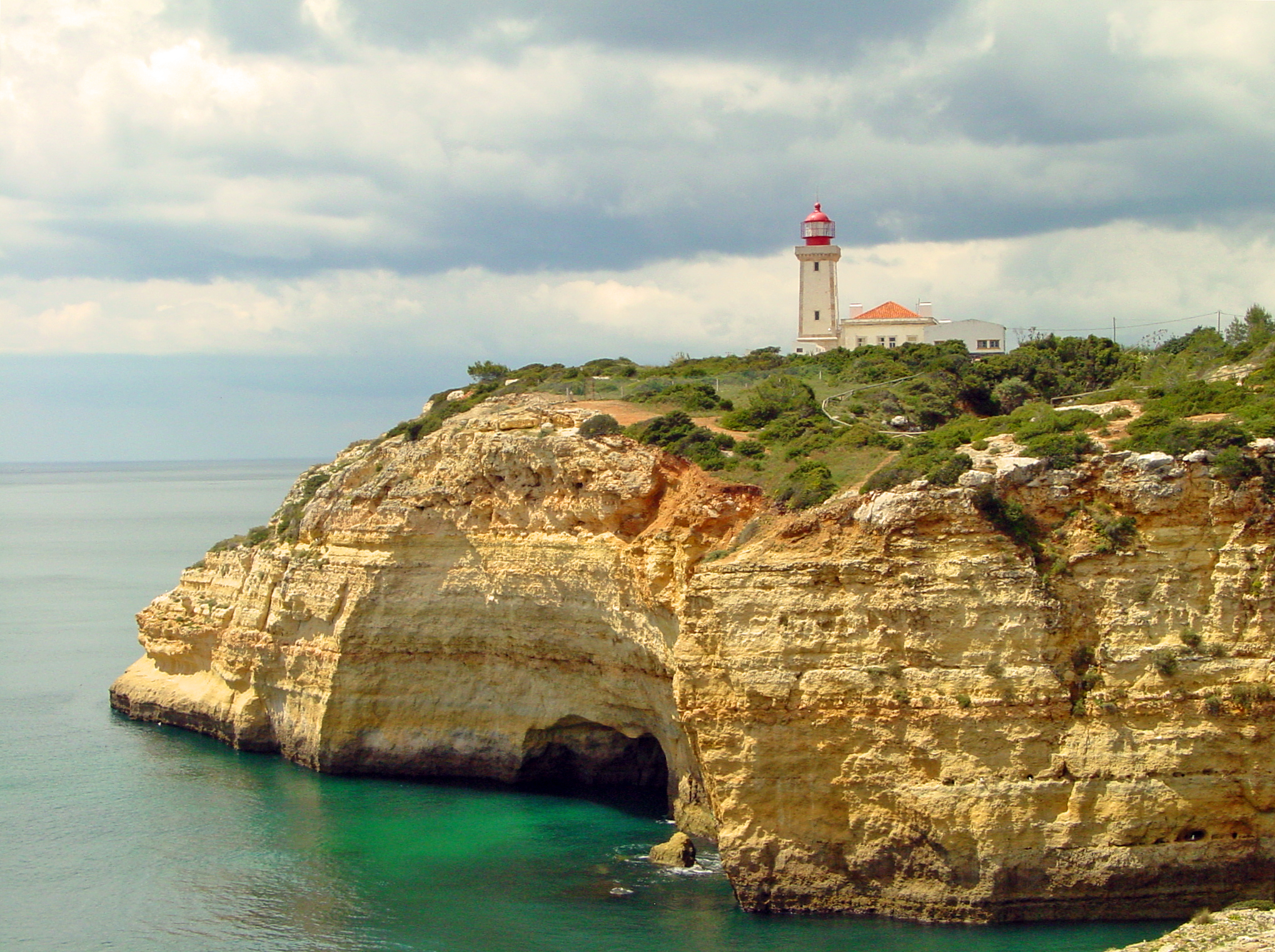
Lighthouse of Alfanzina (Carvoeiro).

- Lighthouse of Alfanzina (Farol da Alfazina), comprising a main rectangular central block, connected by a hall to lateral wings (used as residences/living quarters) and a central circular tower with a spiral staircase; the interior is covered with azulejo tiles. The design is comparable to the old lighthouse of Ponta dos Capelinhos and Ribeirinha (on the island of Faial in the Azores) or the lighthouse of Cabo Sardão.

=== Military ===
- Fort of Our Lady of the Incarnation (Forte de Carvoeiro/Forte de Nossa Senhora da Encarnação): little remains of the fortress aside from the eastern wall, where the hermitage of Nossa Senhora da Encarnação and older buildings of the Fiscal Guard can be seen. The fort was constructed in 1670 under the direction of the Governor of Algarve, D. Nuno de Mendonça, Count of Val dos Reis, but began to serve as a customs office (posto fiscal) in 1871 before becoming a cultural attraction in the mid-20th century.
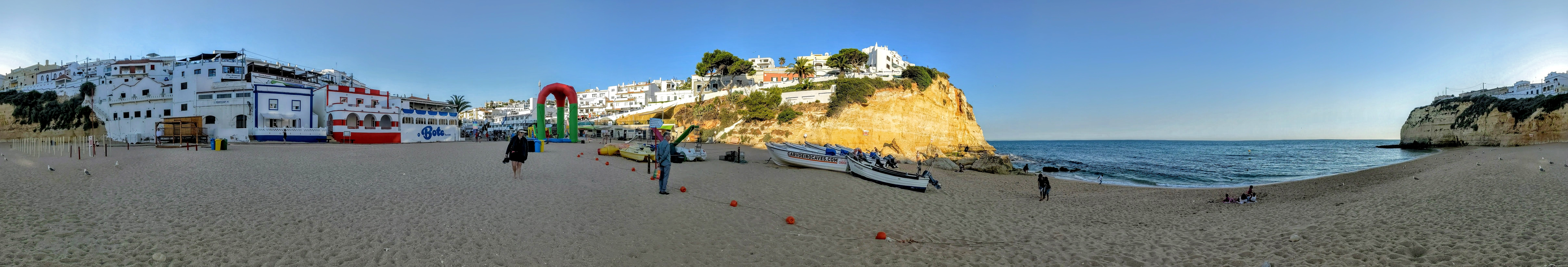
Evening on Carvoeiro Beach

== Transport ==
Carvoeiro lacks direct access to train service: the nearest railway station is the Estombar-Lagoa station, which is approximately 8 km away. From there, regional trains connect to Lisbon, Porto, and Faro. There are local buses in Carvoeiro, but the network may not serve all the popular tourist sites. Car rentals and taxi services are other options in Carvoeiro and the surrounding Algarve.

== Beaches ==
=== Carvoeiro Beach ===
Carvoeiro Beach (in Portuguese: Praia de Carvoeiro) is popular for its craggy cliffs and calm waters and for its location in the centre of Carvoeiro. As well, it is possible to take a boat trip to nearby caves or to take part in water sports. The beach can get very busy during the summer.

=== Vale de Centeanes Beach ===
Vale de Centeanes Beach (in Portuguese: Praia do Vale de Centeanes) is surrounded by high cliffs. A shallow valley leading down to the beach's eastern end makes access fairly easy even by wheelchair. There are facilities for families, including a seasonal lifeguard service. As well, a bar on the beach is a popular spot to watch the sun set.

=== Marinha Beach ===
Marinha Beach (in Portuguese: Praia da Marinha) is an archetypal Algarve cove where clear turquoise waters lap up against orange limestone cliffs and iconic rock formations. It is small and sandy. Boat trips are available from the beach, and paddle boats can be hired there. In the summer, it can get quite crowded.

=== Paraíso Beach ===
Paraíso Beach (in Portuguese: Praia do Paraíso) is a small, hidden cove that is surrounded by rocky cliffs and lush vegetation. It is secluded and offers tranquillity and picturesque views.

== Sports ==
A variety of water sports can be enjoyed in Carvoeiro. Kayaking allows people to explore sea caves and beaches up close. Tour operators offer a 2-hour kayak tour through the Benagil caves.

On land, there are a number of golf courses in and around Carvoeiro.

== See also ==
- Lagoa, Algarve
