= Benagil =

Hamlet in Algarve, Portugal

Coordinates: 37°05′15″N 8°25′33″W

- Hamlet
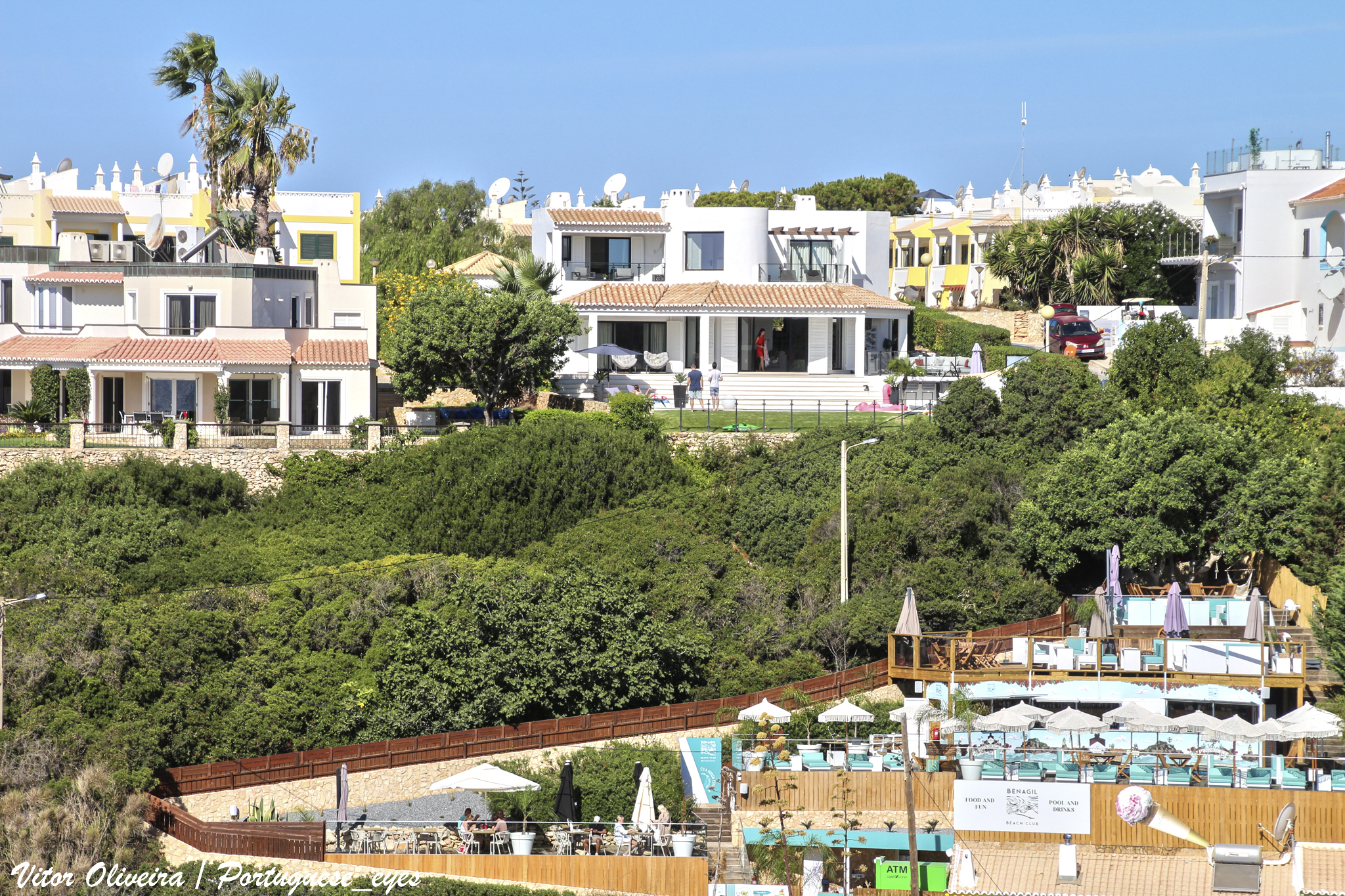
- Benagil
- Interactive map of Benagil
- Country: Portugal
- Civil Parish: Lagoa and Carvoeiro
- Municipality: Lagoa
- Region: Algarve
- Postal code: 8400-401 Lagoa

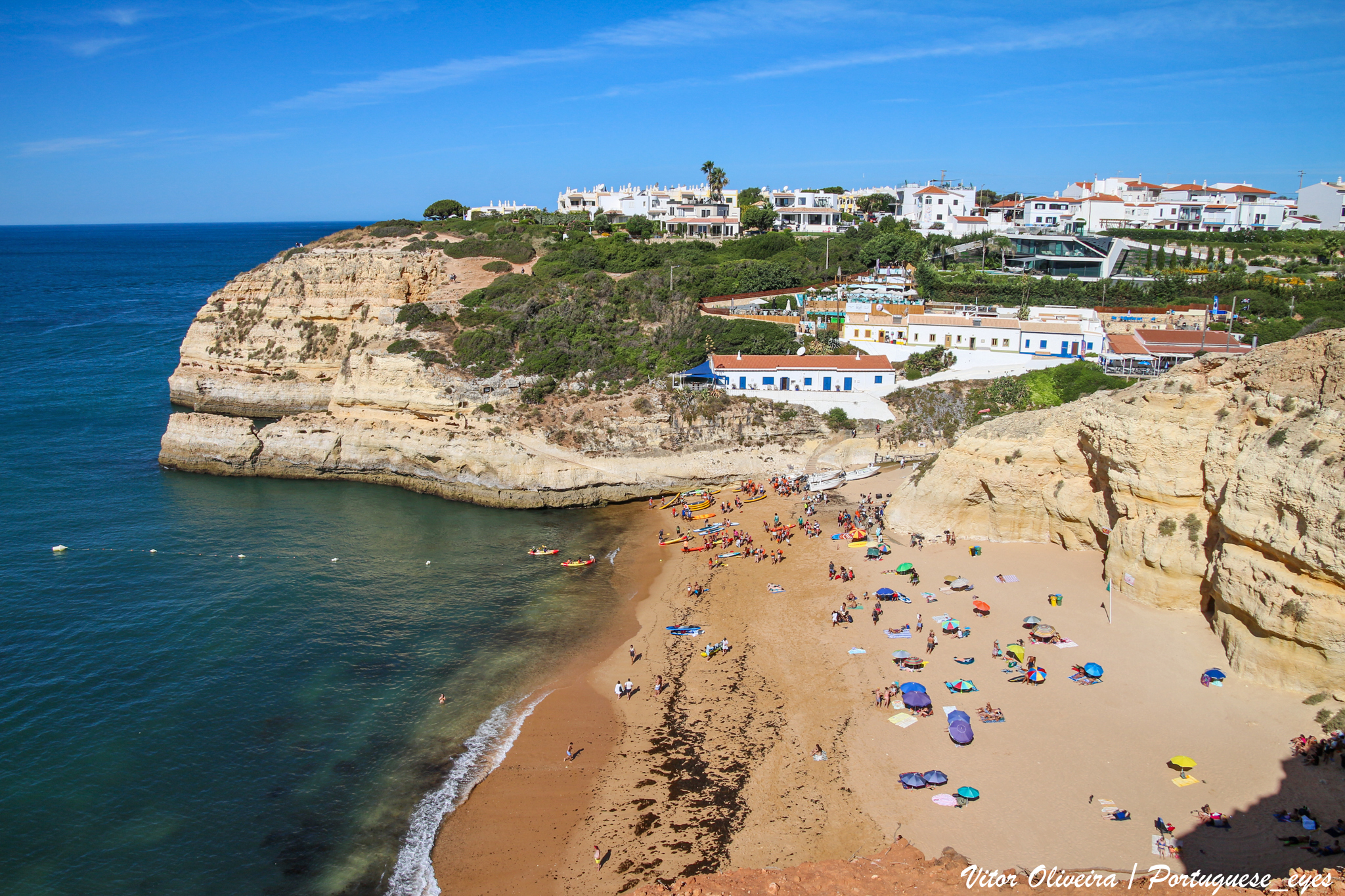
Benagil village with its beach

Benagil is a hamlet in Portugal, located in the civil parish of Lagoa and Carvoeiro, on the Atlantic coast of the municipality of Lagoa, in the Algarve region.

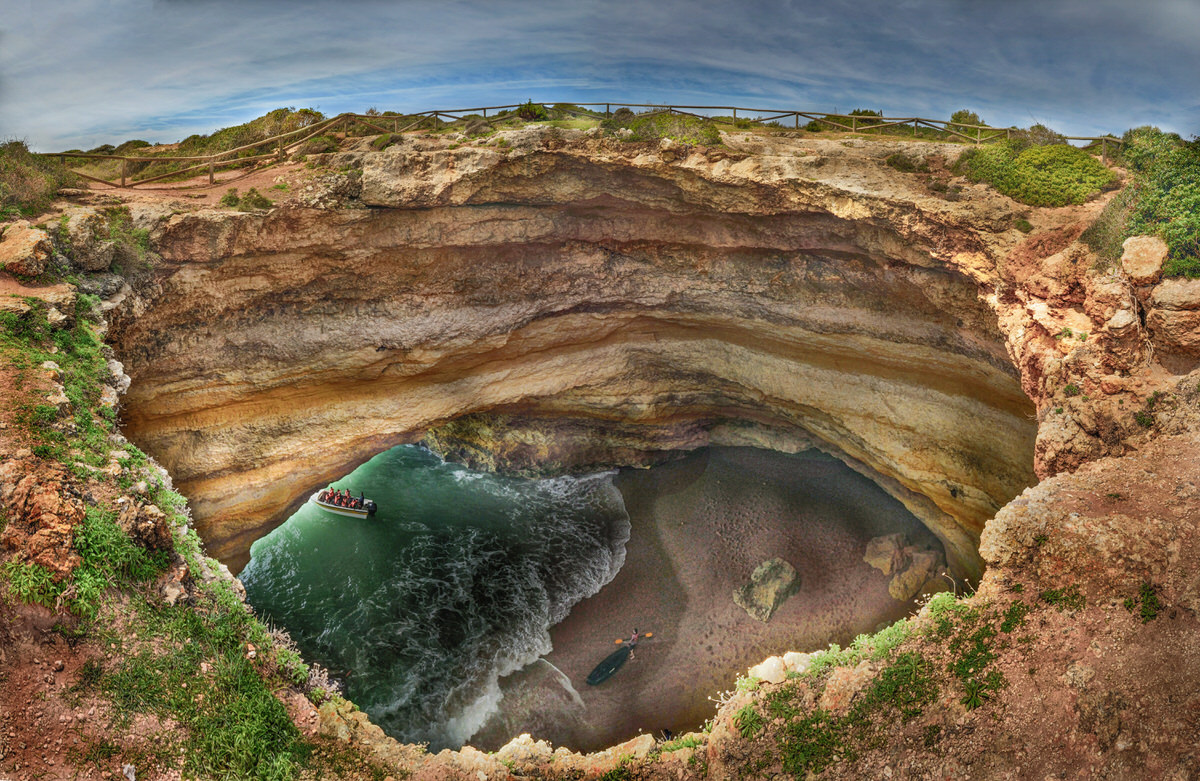
Above view of Benagil Cave

Up to the late 20th century, the village's economy was based on ocean fishing, but it developed into a tourist area with a widely used beach, Praia de Benagil. It has few inhabitants but in the summer many people come from abroad. The population is roughly 60. Benagil village and beach are located close to the internationally famous Marinha Beach.

The main tourist attraction in Benagil is the Benagil Cave (Portuguese: Algar de Benagil). Out of all sea caves that dot the Algarve coastline between Lagos and Albufeira, the Benagil Cave is the only one that has been eroded both from the side and from the top. This unique natural process has resulted in an opening in the ceiling that allows the sunlight to brighten up the grotto and the beach that it hides.

Since 2023, concerns surrounding overtourism and safety were raised, leading to a number of regulations being implemented. Only sanctioned tours are permitted in the grotto and watercraft are no longer been permitted to land on the beach. Since August 2024, limits have been imposed on the number of vessels in the cave at any one time and visiting time has been capped to a maximum of two minutes per boat. There have been proposals to set limits and an admission fee for tourists.

== See also ==
- Caramujeira
