= Convent of Our Lady of Mount Carmel (Lagoa) =

- Convento de Nossa Senhora do Carmo
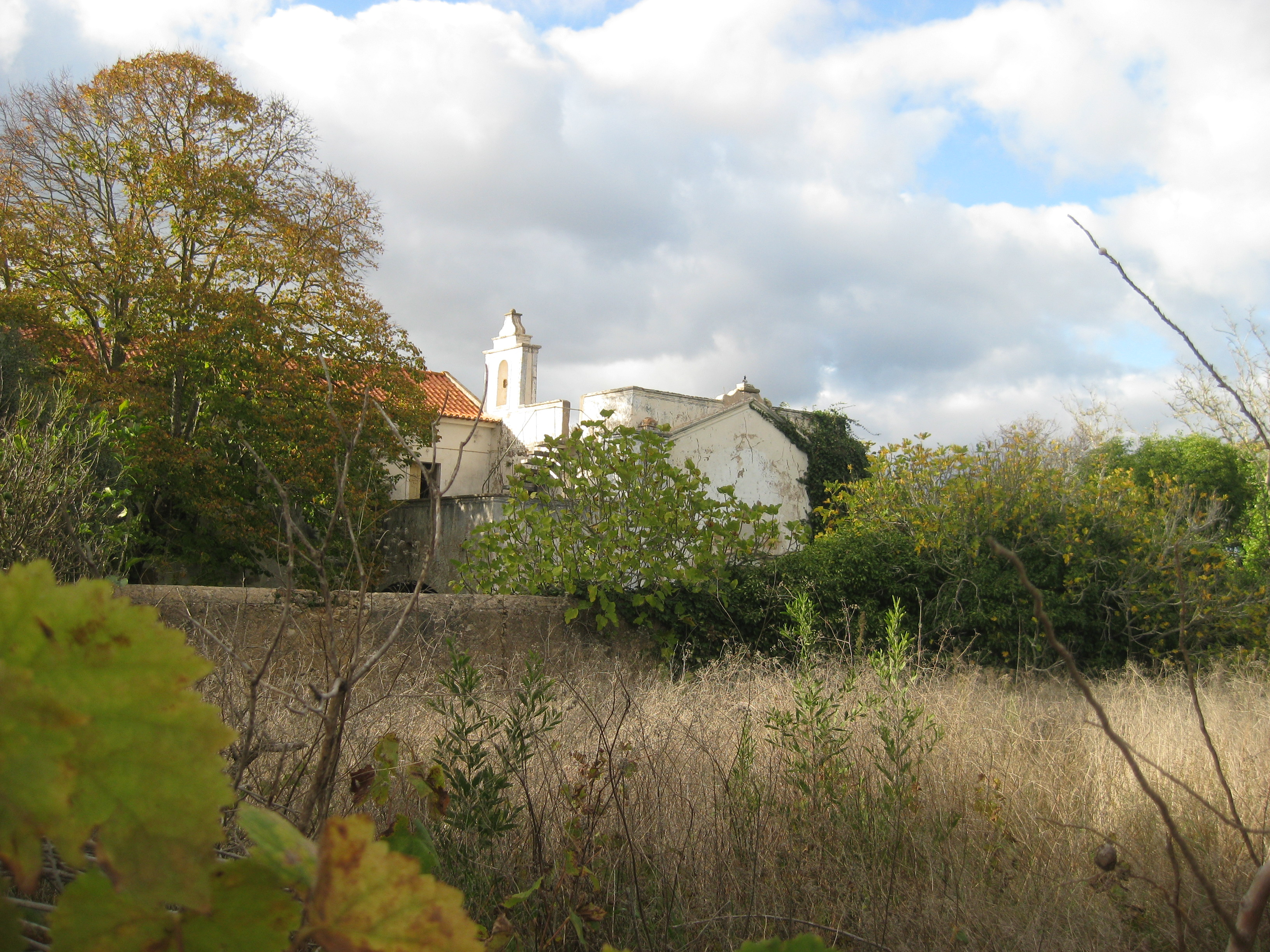
- A glimpse of the buildings of the Convent of Our Lady of Mount Carmel near Lagoa, Algarve.
- Interactive map of the Convent of Our Lady of Mount Carmel area

General information
- Type: Convent
- Architectural style: Medieval
- Location: Lagoa, Lagoa, Portugal
- Coordinates: 37°7′34.93″N 8°25′15.73″W
- Opened: 1550
- Owner: Portuguese Republic

Technical details
- Material: Masonry

The Convent of Our Lady of Mount Carmel (Portuguese: Convento da Nossa Senhora do Carmo; which was in fact referred to as the Convent of Our Lady of Help/Aid (Portuguese: Convento da Nossa Senhora do Socorro)) is a medieval carmelite convent and church complex in the civil parish of Lagoa in the municipality of Lagoa in the Portuguese Algarve. The original convent was all but destroyed in the 1755 Lisbon earthquake. After the extinction of the religious orders in Portugal in 1834, the property was taken over by a signeurial family which continued to provide church services.

== History ==
Founded in 1550 by Pedro Fernandes, scribe of the household of Catherine of Habsburg, Queen of Portugal, the Convent of Our Lady of Mount Carmel was built in an isolated parcel 1 kilometre (0.62 mi) east-southeast of Lagoa. Yet, in reality two dates are associated with this religious complex, the other being 18 June 1550, when Queen Catherine of Portugal, through friar Bento Bueno (or Bento Bom) indicated her interest in the construction of a convent for the Carmelite Orders of the Algarve.

For many years it was the home of the several male Carmelites of the Ancient Observance, of the Order of the Brothers of Our Lady of Mount Carmel (Portuguese: Ordem dos Irmãos de Nossa Senhora do Monte Carmelo). When the monasteries and religious institutions were closed and/or extinguished by alternating liberal politicians, the Carmelites abandoned this site, which then passed into private hands.

After the 1722 and 1755 earthquakes (1 November 1755), the convent was heavily damaged; from records written by Moreira de Mendonça,"the Convent of Carmel, which was constructed a few years earlier, was unmade entirely...".

On 8 October 1825, the site was abandoned completely by the monks, leading to its ruins as early as 1834, passing into the hands of private property-owners. It was these new owners, the antecedents of the Cabrita family, who reconstructed much of the church and grounds. Private masses came to be celebrated in the chapel of the convent, along with the celebration of an annual festival (with procession) in honour of Our Lady of Mount Carmel, the patroness of the Carmelite Order.

In 1867, based on ordinances issued on 26 November 1863 and 24 August 1864 concerning the possessions of extinguished religious orders throughout the Kingdom, the Ministry of Finances (Portuguese: Ministério da Fazenda) transferred the responsibility for books and documents of the convent from the General-Directorate of National Properties (Portuguese: Direcção-Geral dos Próprios Nacionais) to the National Archive of Torre do Tombo in Lisbon. Some of these custodial documents were returned to this agency on 14 May 1894.

== See also ==
- Order of the Brothers of Our Lady of Mount Carmel
- Enclosed religious orders
