= Índio (footballer, born 1981) =

Brazilian footballer

Personal information
- Full name: Antônio Rogério Silva Oliveira
- Date of birth: 21 November 1981 (age 44)
- Place of birth: Itatira, Ceará, Brazil
- Height: 1.77 m (5 ft 10 in)
- Position: Forward

Senior career*
Years	Team	Apps	(Gls)
2000	Uniclinic		
2001	Guarany de Sobral		
2002	Ferroviário		
2003–2005	Ipitanga		
2005–2013	Vitória	55	(18)
2008–2009	→ Gyeongnam FC (loan)	48	(15)
2010–2011	→ Chunnam Dragons (loan)	38	(10)
2012	→ América-RN (loan)	2	(0)
2013	→ Madureira (loan)	5	(0)
2013	→ Tiradentes (loan)	7	(3)
2014	Potiguar	3	(0)
2014	Vitória da Conquista	6	(1)
2014–2015	Beira-Mar	10	(5)
2015	Ypiranga		
2016	Jacuipense	2	(0)
2016	Alto Santo	10	(5)
2017	Real Ariquemes	10	(2)
- * Club domestic league appearances and goals

Antônio Rogério Silva Oliveira (born 21 November 1981, in Itatira), known as Índio, is a retired Brazilian footballer.

He played domestically for Uniclinic AC, Guarany de Sobral, Ferroviário AC, EC Ipitanga, EC Vitória, América RN, Madureira and Tiradentes-CE, and spent time on loan at South Korean clubs Gyeongnam FC and Chunnam Dragons, before joining Portuguese club Beira-Mar in 2014.

== Club honours ==
=== Club ===
Gyeongnam FC

- Korean FA Cup Runner-up: 2008
