= Lagoa do Barro do Piauí =

Coordinates: 8.47778°S 41.5269°W

- Municipality
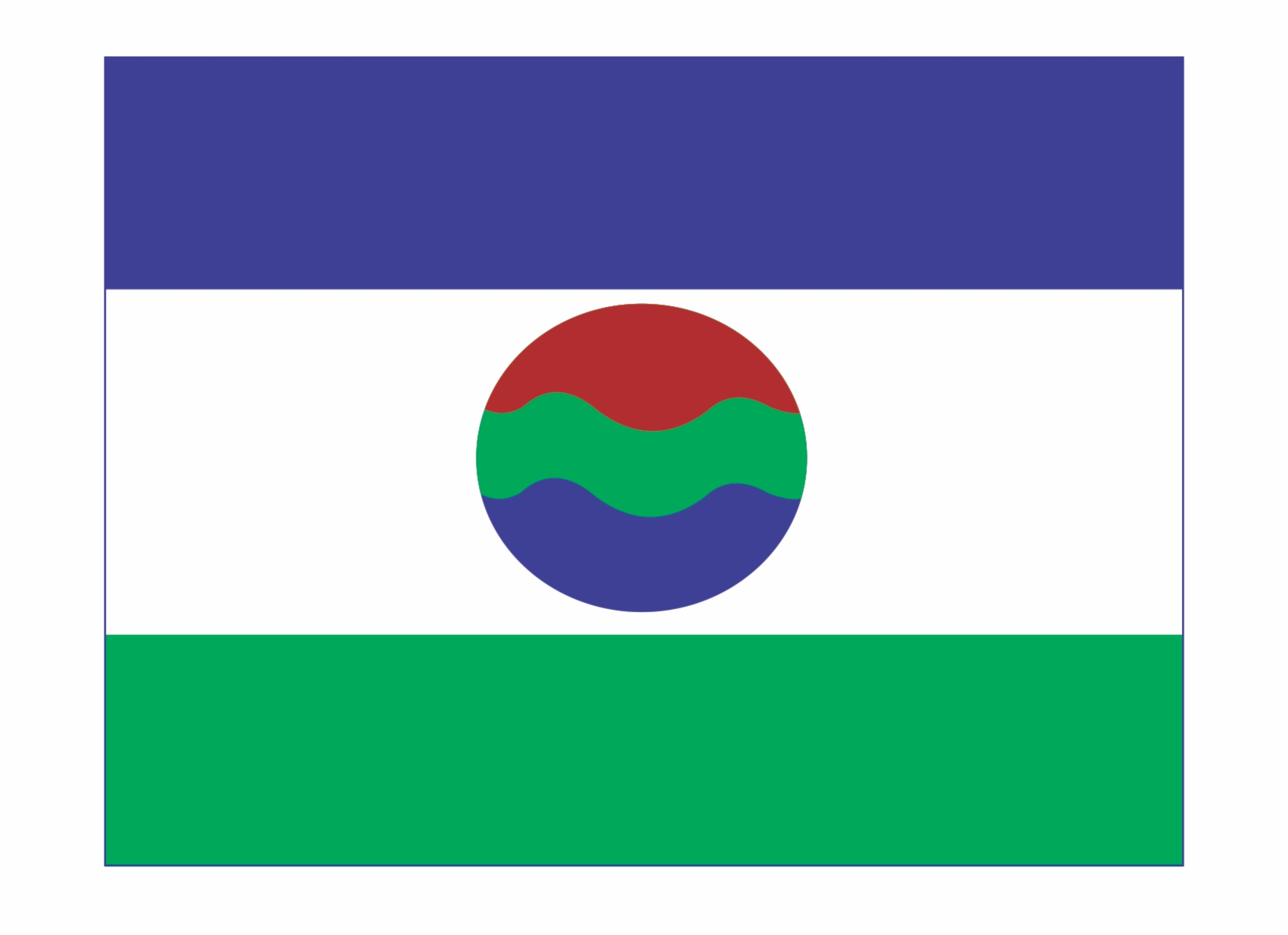
- Flag

- Country: Brazil
- Region: Nordeste
- State: Piauí
- Mesoregion: Sudeste Piauiense

Population (2020)
  - Total: 4,656
- Time zone: UTC−3 (BRT)

Lagoa do Barro do Piauí is a municipality in the state of Piauí in the Northeast region of Brazil.

== See also ==
- List of municipalities in Piauí
