= Foundation Cearense for Meteorology and Water Management =

Foundation Cearense for Meteorology and Water Resources - FUNCEME (Portuguese: Fundação Cearense de Meteorologia e Recursos Hídricos), is a foundation run by the state government of Ceará, which conducts research and information about meteorology and water resources of the state with headquarters in the city of Fortaleza. It also develops grant to the planning, implementation and development of public policies or actions of private enterprise in need of support in information about climate, hydrology and environment.
