= Itatira =

Municipality in Ceará, Brazil

- Municipality
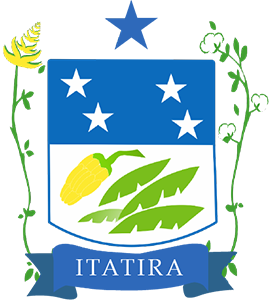
- Flag Coat of arms

- Location in Ceará state

- Location in Brazil
- Coordinates: 4°30′S 39°37′W
- Country: Brazil
- Region: Northeast
- State: Ceará

Population (2020)
  - Total: 21,836
- Time zone: UTC-03:00 (BRT)

Itatira is a city in the Brazilian state of Ceará.

== Landmarks ==
- Serra da Boa Vista

== Notable people ==
- Índio (born 1981), footballer
