= Praia da Marinha =

Beach in the Algarve, Portugal

Praia da Marinha Marinha Beach
- Beach
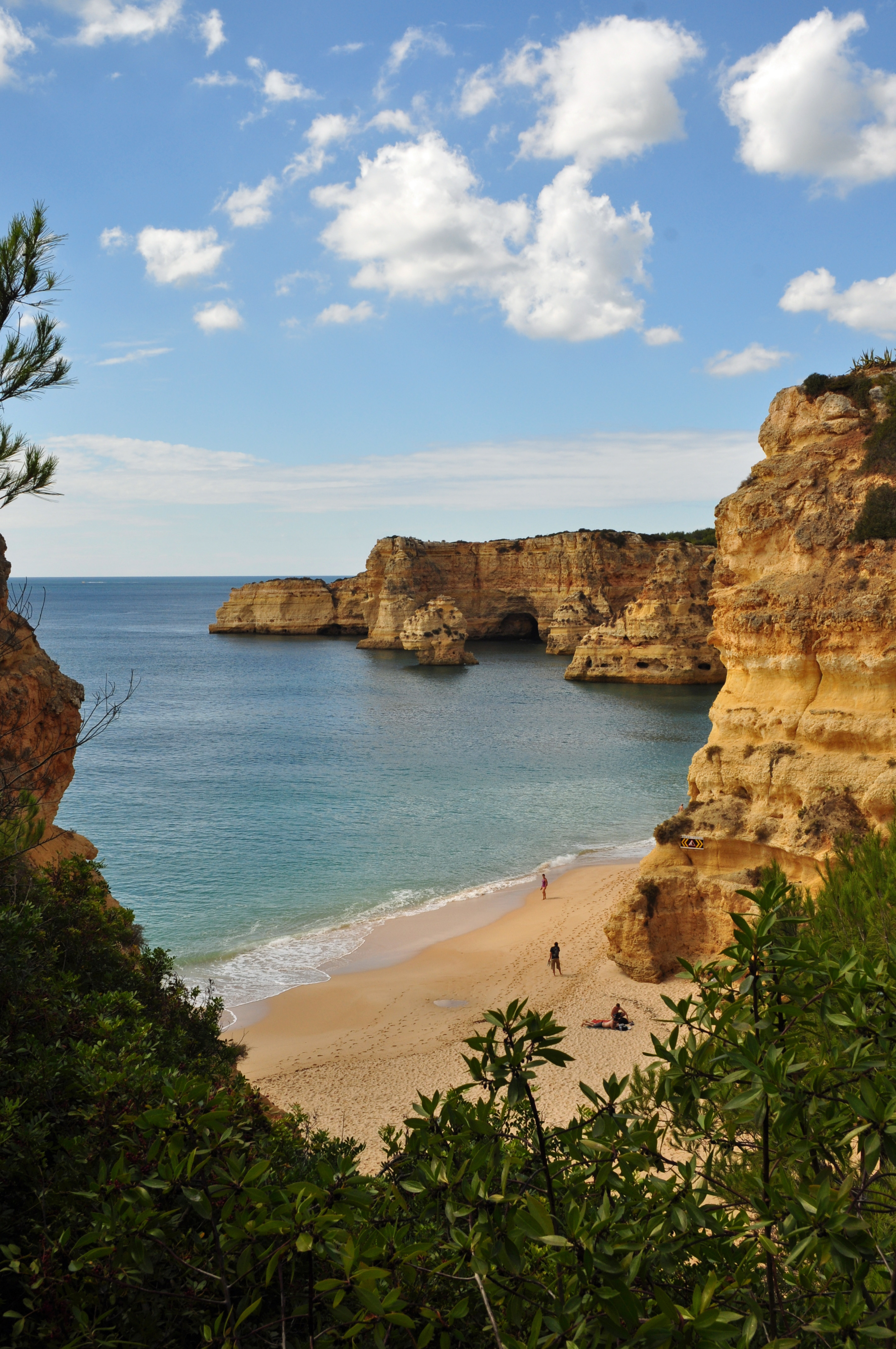
- Marinha Beach in Caramujeira, Algarve

- Location within Portugal
- Coordinates: 37°05′24.3″N 8°24′45.0″W
- Location: Caramujeira, Lagoa and Carvoeiro, Algarve, Portugal

Praia da Marinha (in English means Navy Beach) or Marinha Beach is one of the most emblematic beaches of Portugal with a hot-summer Mediterranean climate and located on the Atlantic coast in Caramujeira, an hamlet of the Lagoa municipality, in the Algarve region, and considered by the Michelin Guide as one of the 10 most beautiful beaches in Europe and as one of the 100 most beautiful beaches in the world.

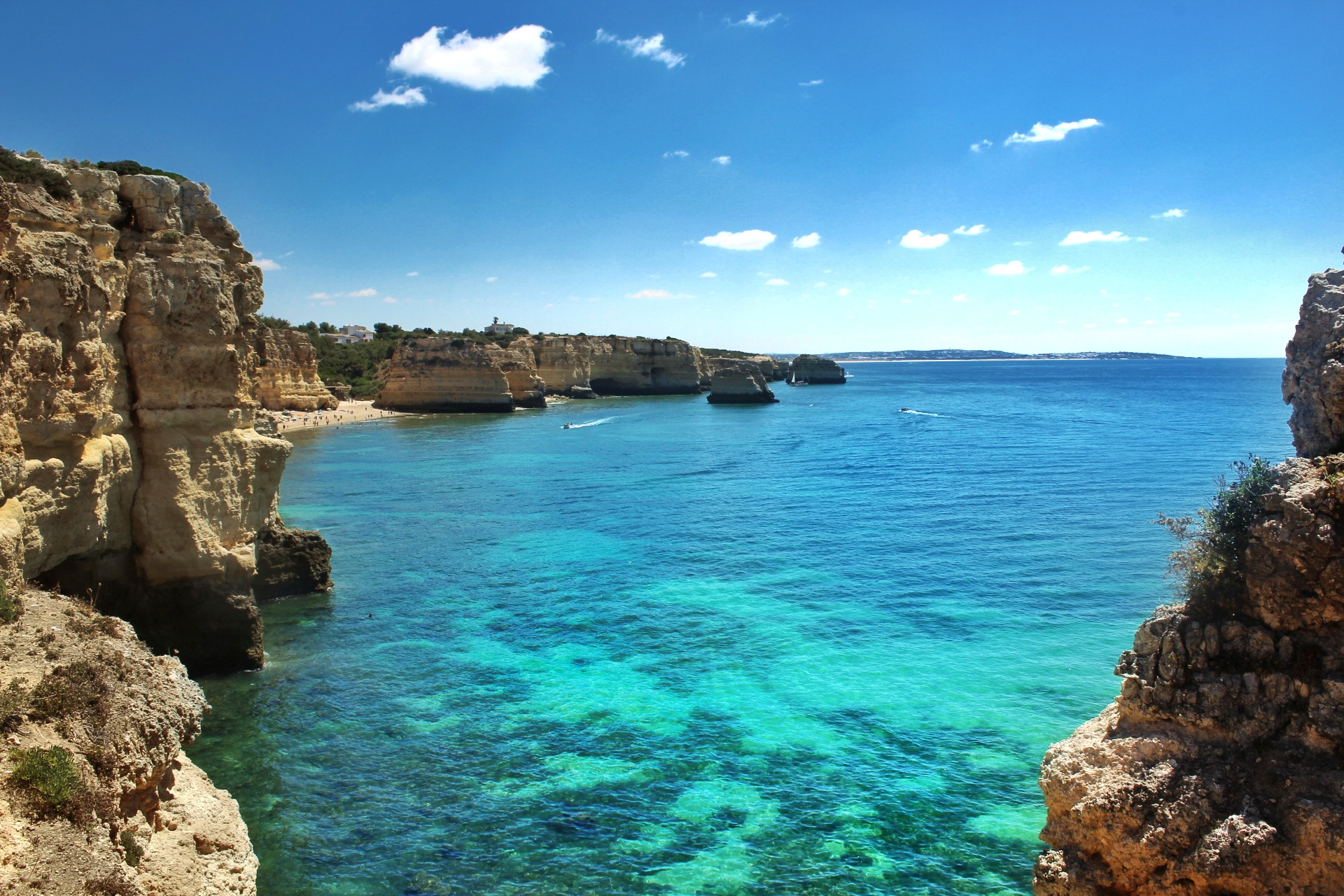
Panoramic view of the blue sea of Marinha Beach in Caramujeira, Lagoa, Algarve

In 1998, Marinha Beach was also awarded with the distinguished with the "Golden Beach award" by the Portuguese Ministry of the Environment because of its outstanding natural qualities. Furthermore, many pictures of this beach have often been used in promotional material and book guides of Portugal distributed around the world. The beach itself is fairly small and sandy, and orange limestone cliffs border this famous beach. The beach also has some difficulty to get there, it is a little off the main road and the foot path takes a sharp descent downward.

This beach is not only famous for its cliffs, but also for the quality of the water. Marinha Beach has often been used by international advertising agencies and by television producers in advertising campaigns.

In 2018, the US television network CNN chose Marinha Beach in the Algarve as one of the 20 most beautiful in the world in the category of beaches with cliffs.

In 2019, CNN re-elected Marinha Beach as the Portuguese beach with the award for best spot to visit in September and also as one of the best destinations in the world.

== Gallery ==
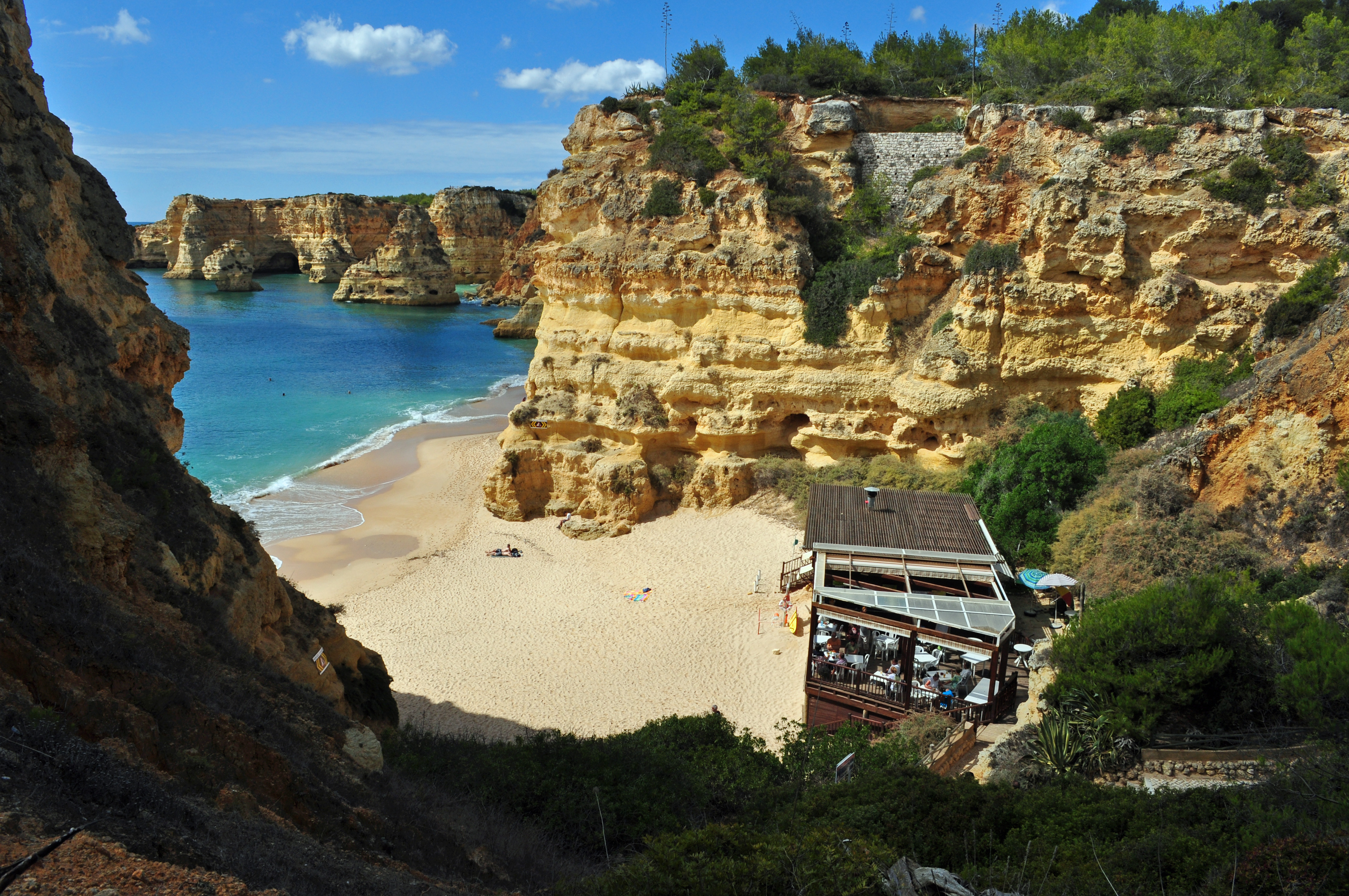
Marinha Beach

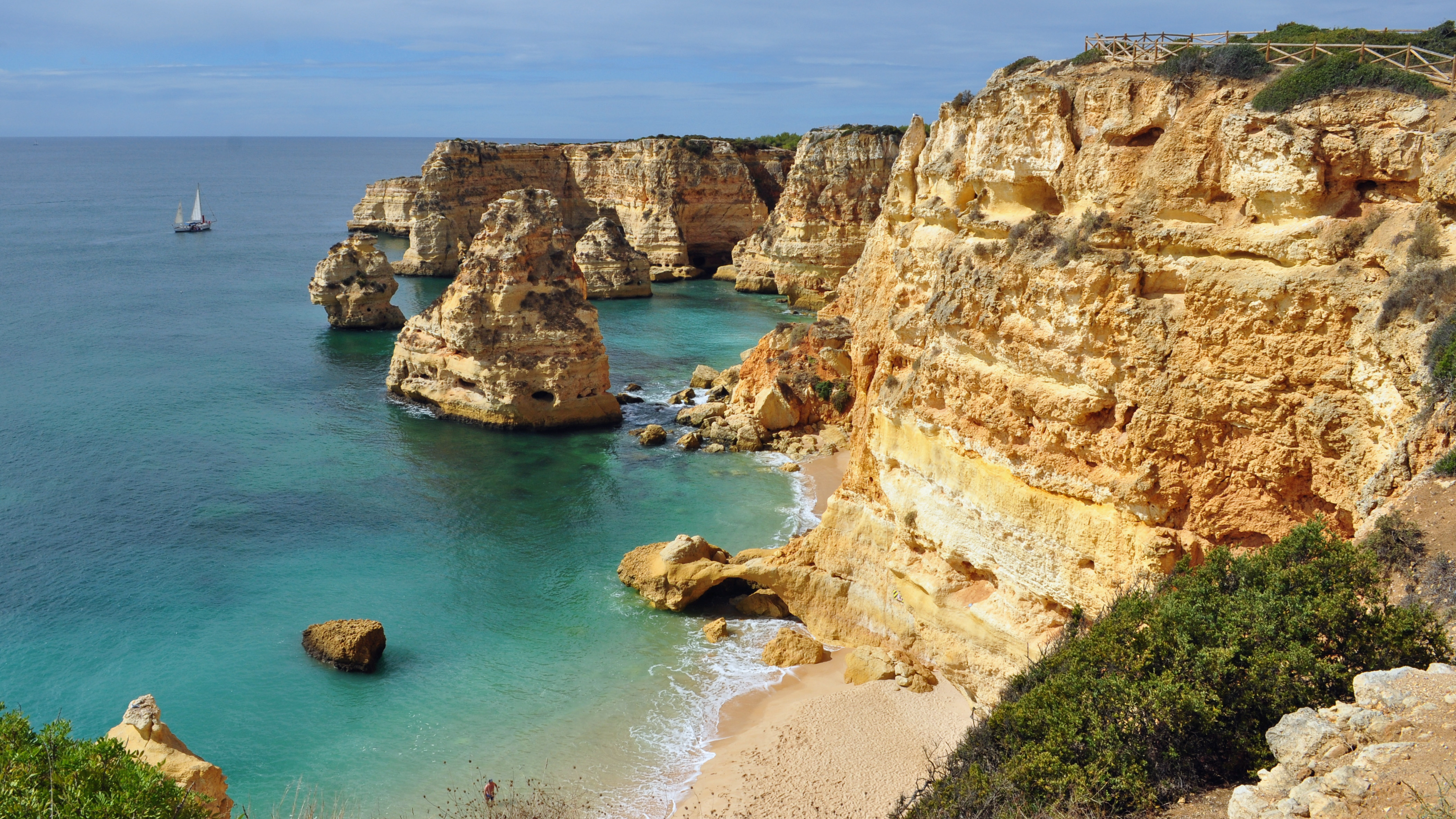
Marinha Beach

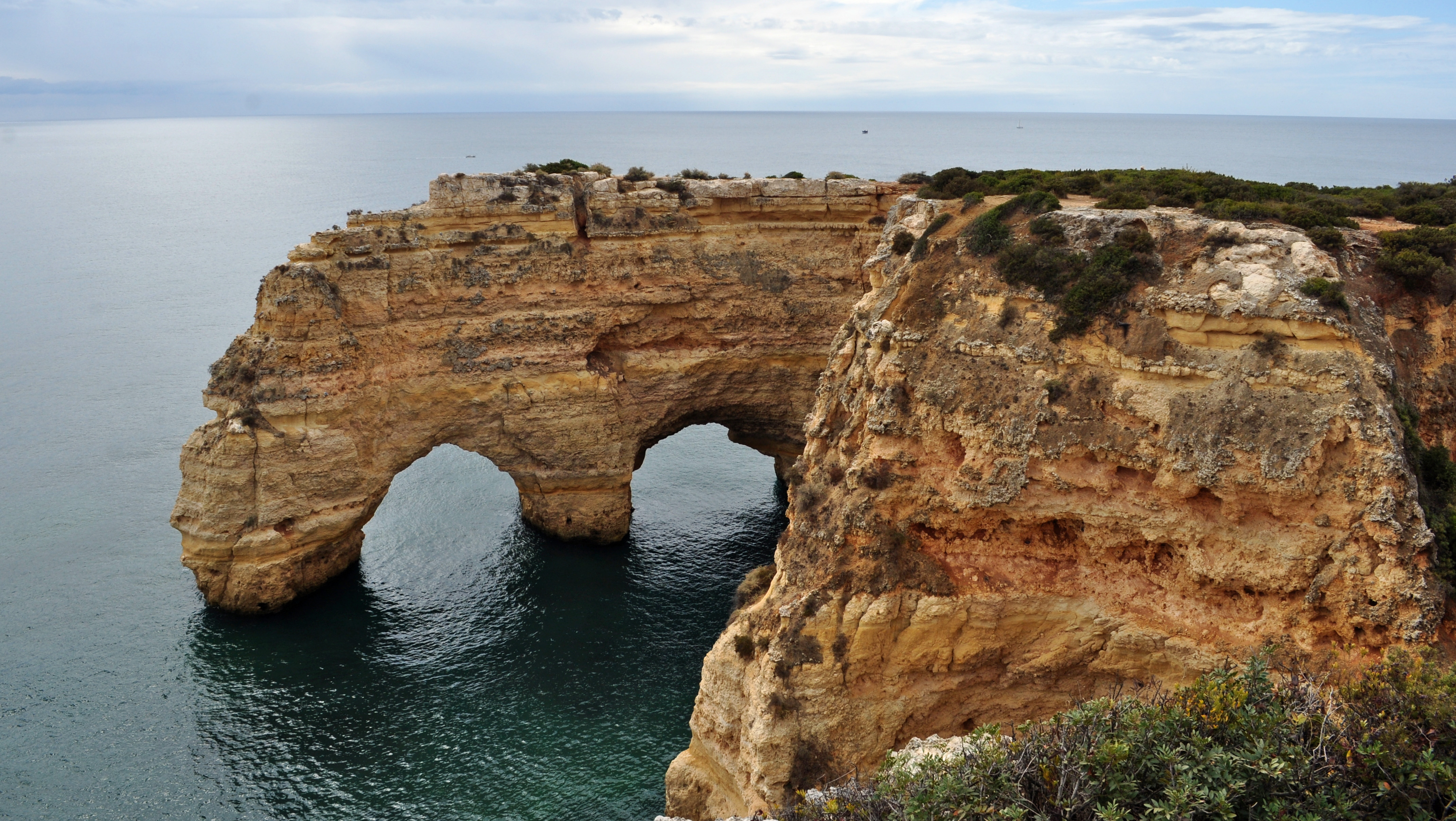
Marinha Beach

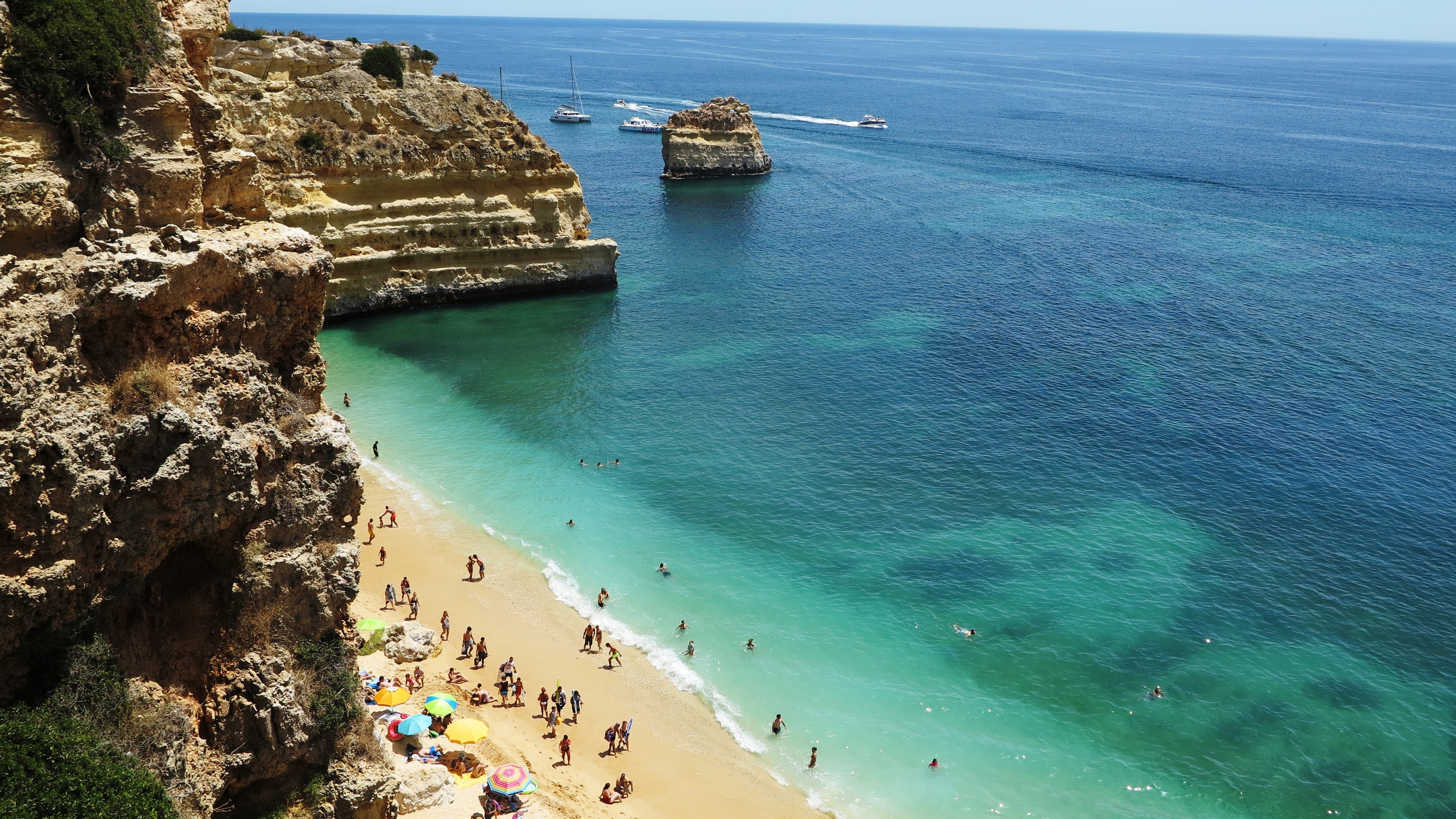
Marinha Beach

== See also ==
- Carvoeiro
- Lagoa
- Tourism in Portugal
