= São Sebastião de Lagoa de Roça =

Coordinates: 7.08278°S 35.835°W

- Municipality
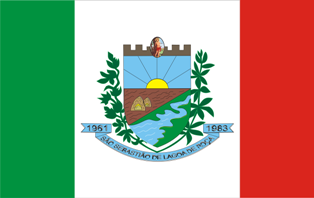
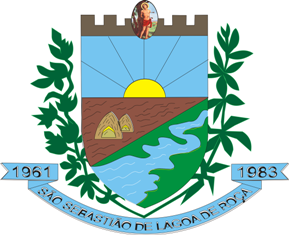
- Flag Coat of arms
- Interactive map of São Sebastião de Lagoa de Roça
- Country: Brazil
- Region: South
- State: Paraíba
- Mesoregion: Agreste Paraibano

Population (2020)
  - Total: 11,728
- Time zone: UTC−3 (BRT)

São Sebastião de Lagoa de Roça (Central northeastern portuguese pronunciation: [ˈsɐ̃w sɛbɐʃtjˈɐ̃w di lɐɡˈoɐ di ˈhɔsɐ]) is a municipality in the state of Paraíba in the Northeast Region of Brazil.

== See also ==
- List of municipalities in Paraíba
