= São José da Lagoa Tapada =

Coordinates: 6°57′S 38°10′W

- Municipality
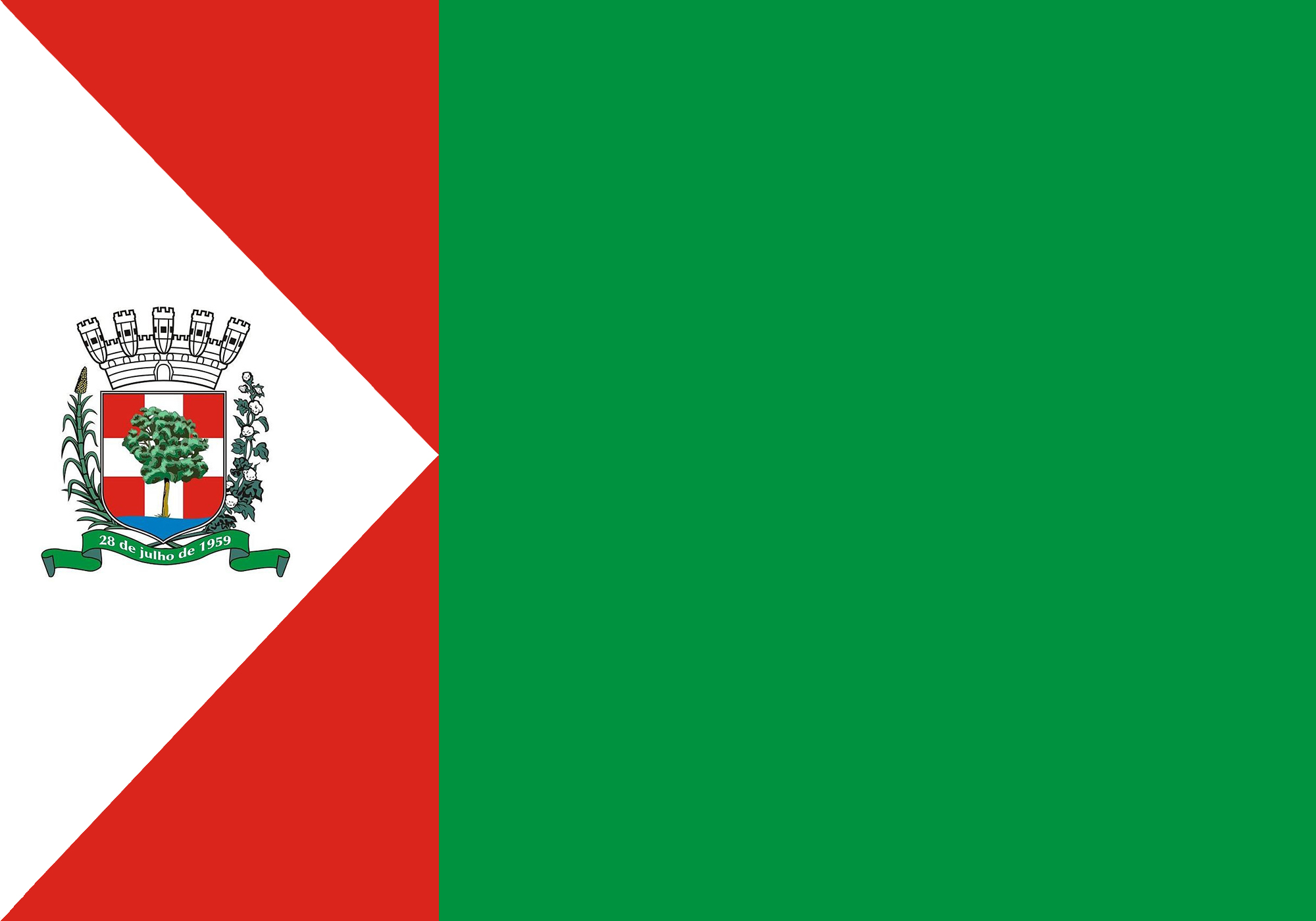
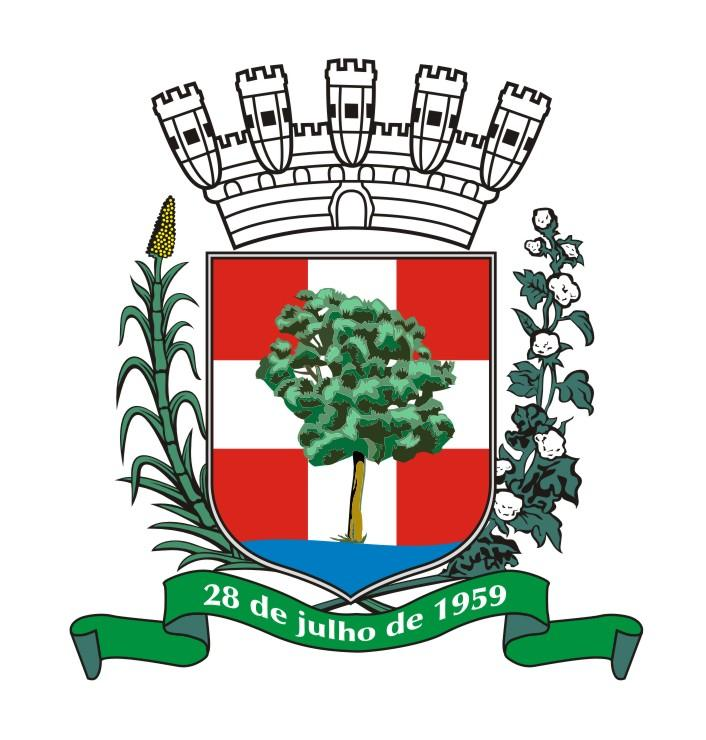
- Flag Coat of arms
- Interactive map of São José da Lagoa Tapada
- Country: Brazil
- Region: Northeast
- State: Paraíba
- Mesoregion: Sertao Paraibana

Population (2020)
  - Total: 7,626
- Time zone: UTC−3 (BRT)

São José da Lagoa Tapada is a municipality in the state of Paraíba in the Northeast Region of Brazil.

== See also ==
- List of municipalities in Paraíba
