= Lagoa do Mato, Ceará =

Coordinates: 04°41′01″S 39°39′27″W

Lagoa do Mato is a district in Itatira in the state of Ceará (Brazil)

== Features ==
=== Church ===
Famous for its church of Nossa Senhora do Carmo, the region's heritage itatirense. On the 16th of July is celebrated the Feast of Our Lady of Mount Caramel is one of the main cultural events in the region, which attracts thousands of people to its attractions as the religious festival and forró pé de serra typical of the region.

=== Culture ===
From the theatrical religious or not, dance, bonfire parties and sports are characteristics of culture and lagoadomatense also itatirense that has been gaining ground in the central interior of Ceará.

=== Tourism ===
One of the most popular tourist routes of Lagoa do Mato is the Serra da Boa Vista, with approximately 522 feet tall, 1, 713 feet and 4.5 km long, because one of the most famous mountains of the region.
