= Lagoa, Paraíba =

Coordinates: 6°34′15″S 37°54′57″W

- Municipality
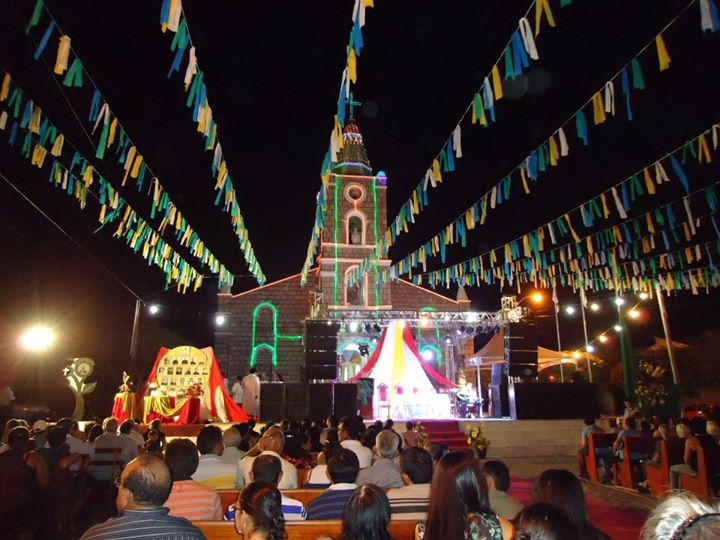

- Flag Coat of arms

- Country: Brazil
- Region: Northeast
- State: Paraíba
- Mesoregion: Sertao Paraibana

Population (2020)
  - Total: 4,653
- Time zone: UTC−3 (BRT)

Lagoa, Paraíba is a municipality in the state of Paraíba in the Northeast Region of Brazil.

== See also ==
- List of municipalities in Paraíba
