= Lagoa do Mato, Maranhão =

Lagoa do Mato
- Municipality
- The Municipality of Lagoa do Mato
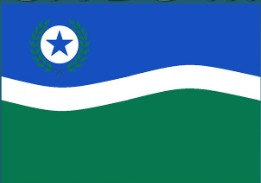
- Flag
- Nickname: "A Princesinha do Médio Sertão" (The Little Princess of the Middle Countryside)
- Motto: Lagoa do Mato seguindo em frente (Lagoa do Mato Carrying On)
- Location of Lagoa do Mato in the State of Maranhão
- Coordinates: 06°02′49″S 43°31′33″W
- Country: Brazil
- Region: Northeast
- State: Maranhão
- Founded: November 10, 1994

Government
  - Mayor: Aluízio Coelho Duarte (DEM)

Area
  - Total: 1,288.863 km^{2} (497.633 sq mi)
- Elevation: 200 m (660 ft)

Population (2020)
  - Total: 11,265
  - Density: 8.7403/km^{2} (22.637/sq mi)
- Time zone: UTC−3 (BRT)
- HDI (2000): 0.550 – medium
- Website: www.lagoadomato.ma.gov.br

Lagoa do Mato is a municipality in the state of Maranhão in the Northeast region of Brazil.

== See also ==
- List of municipalities in Maranhão
