= Lagoa e Carvoeiro =

- Civil parish
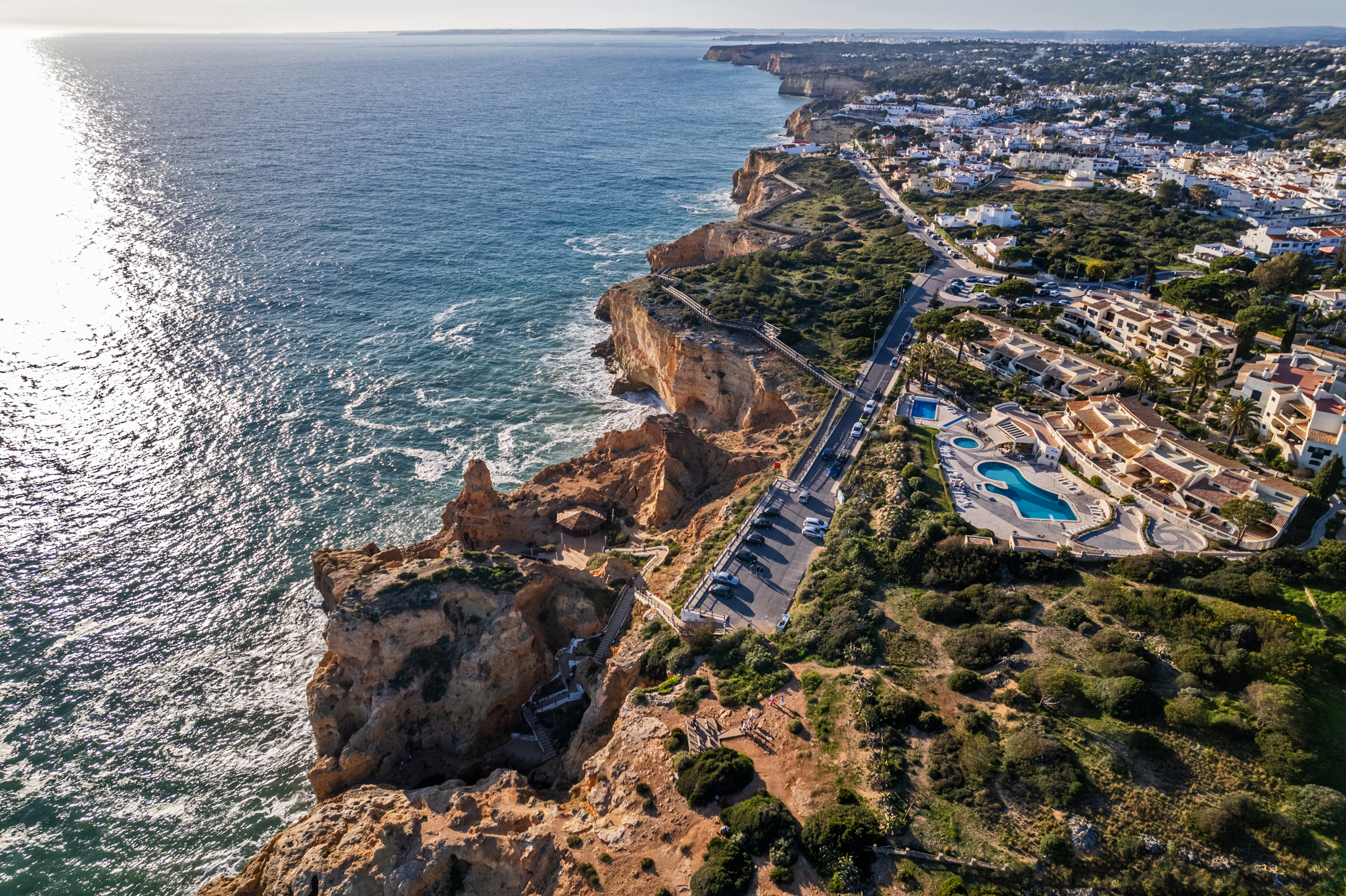

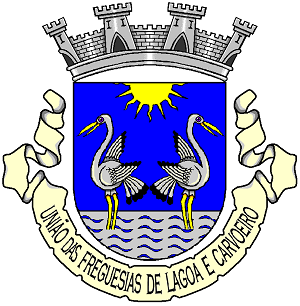
- Coat of arms

- Location in Portugal
- Coordinates: 37.12°N 8.46°W
- Country: Portugal
- Region: Algarve
- Intermunic. comm.: Algarve
- District: Faro
- Municipality: Lagoa

Area
  - Total: 39.13 km^{2} (15.11 sq mi)

Population (2011)
  - Total: 9,987
  - Density: 255.2/km^{2} (661.0/sq mi)
- Time zone: UTC+00:00 (WET)
  - Summer (DST): UTC+01:00 (WEST)
- Postal code: 8400
- Website: www.uf-lagoaecarvoeiro.pt

Lagoa e Carvoeiro is a civil parish in the municipality of Lagoa, Portugal. It was formed in 2013 by the merger of the former civil parishes of Lagoa and Carvoeiro. The population in 2011 was 9,987, in an area of 39.13 km².

The offices of the freguesia (civil parish) are in part of the Convent of Saint Joseph.

== Description ==
The historical centre of the civil parish consists of rows of white houses, where broad and narrow streets are intermixed, revealing modern buildings and old palatial houses, some dating from before the Great Earthquake of 1755.

In the same historical center are found old doors and Manueline windows, four-sided roofs and arches spanning narrow lanes, and the vestiges of buildings which have long disappeared.

In Lagoa it is possible to find 18th-century buildings as well as modern ones, historical monuments, and contemporary sculptures which show how the city has evolved into a harmonious weaving of many threads.

== Localities ==
- Alfanzina
- Algar Seco
- Areias dos Moinhos
- Benagil
- Caramujeira
- Carmo
- Carvoeiro
- Lagoa
- Lombos
- Mato Serrão
- Poço Partido
- Salicos
- Sesmarias
- Torrinha
- Vale Covo
- Vale da Lapa
- Vale de Centeanes
- Vale de Currais
- Vale de El-Rei
- Vale de Milho

== Beaches ==
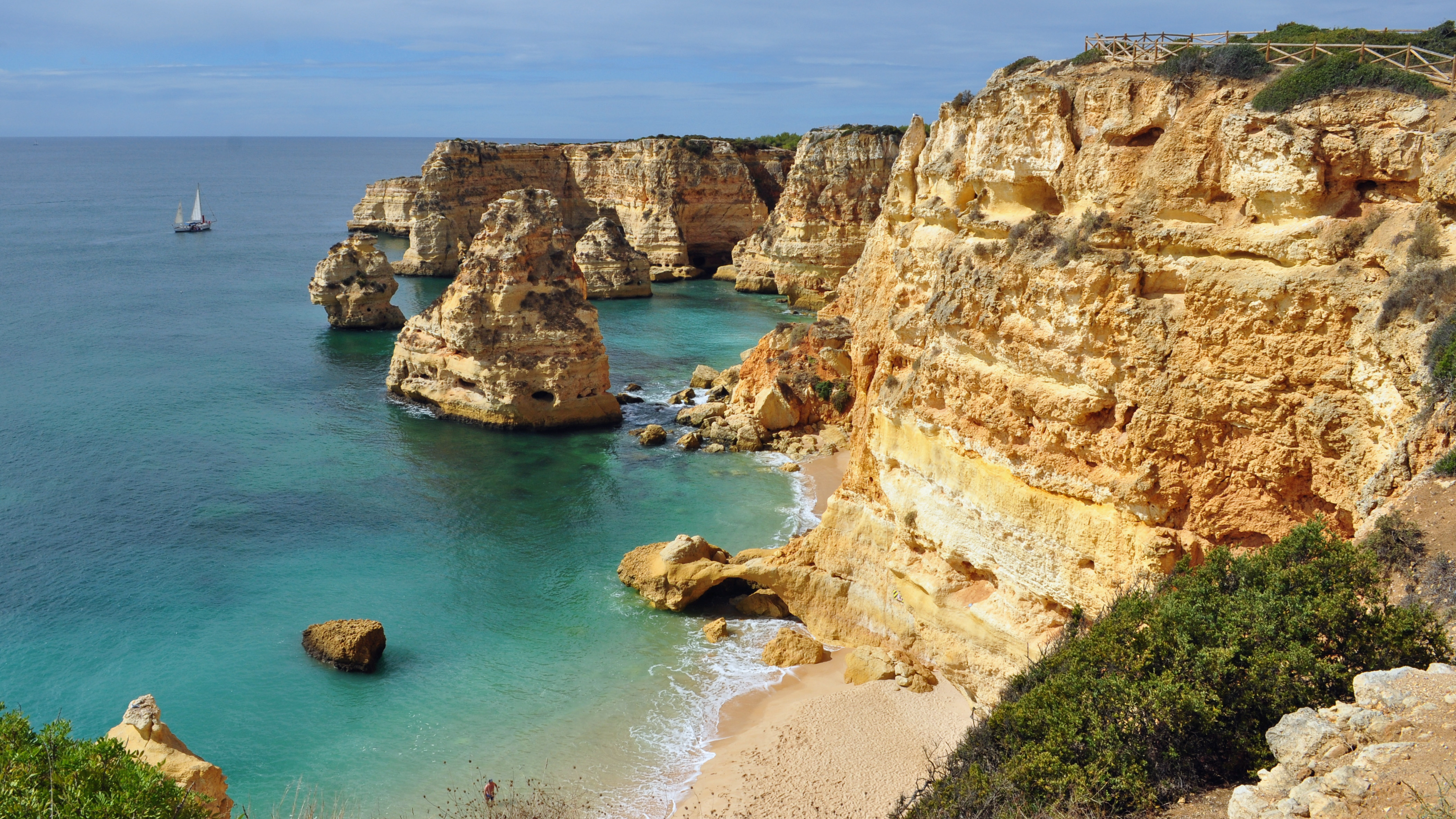
Marinha Beach, in Caramujeira, is the main tourist attraction in the civil parish of Lagoa and Carvoeiro

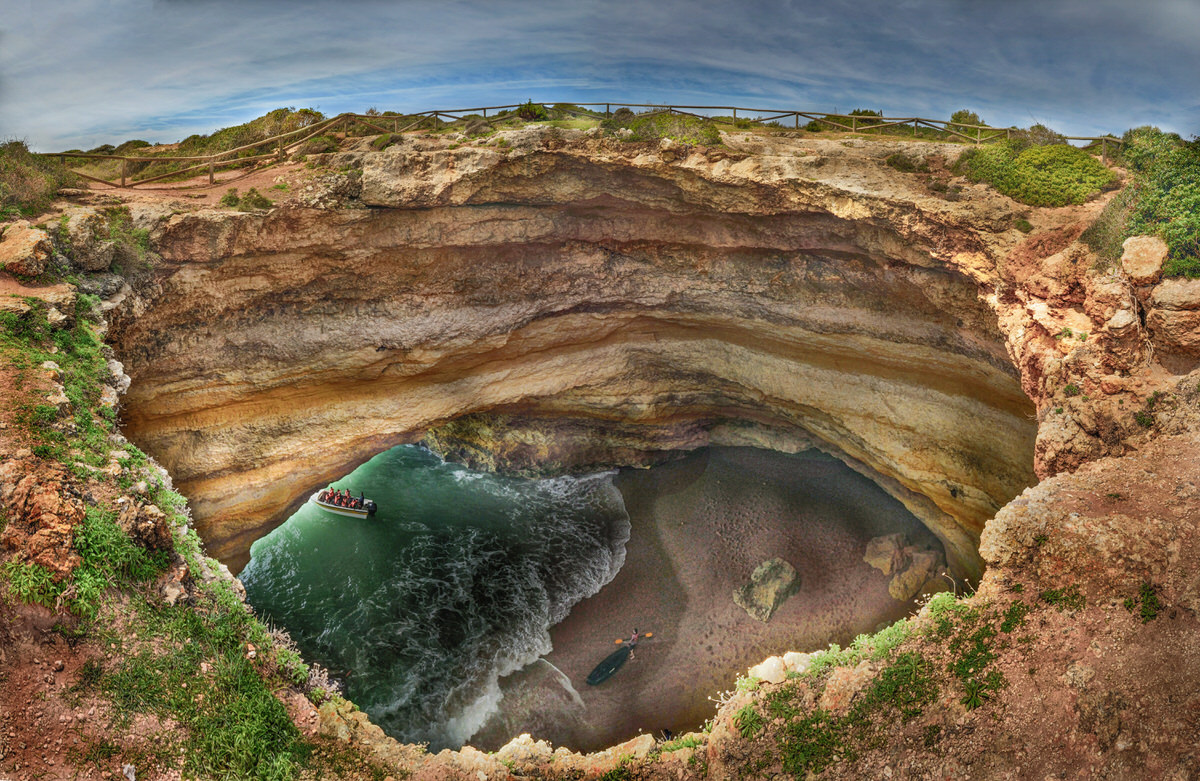
The Algar (or Cave) of Benagil

List of beaches in the parish of Lagoa and Carvoeiro (from West to East):

- Vale da Lapa Beach
- Cama da Vaca Beach
- Padre Vicente Beach
- Três Castelos Beach
- Salgadeira Beach
- Vale dos Currais Beach
- Paraíso Beach
- Carvoeiro Beach
- Vale Covo Beach
- Vale de Centeanes Beach
- Vale de Espinhaço Beach
- Carvalho Beach
- Benagil Beach
- Corredoura Beach
- Cão Raivoso Beach
- Mesquita Beach
- Marinha Beach
- Pau Beach
- Malhada do Baraço Beach
- Barranquinho Beach
- Salgueiro Beach
- Estaquinha Beach
- Albandeira Beach

== Historic sites ==
- Alfanzina Lighthouse (Carvoeiro)
- Church of Our Lady of Light (Lagoa)
- Convent of Saint Joseph (Lagoa)
- Convent of Our Lady of Mount Carmel (Lagoa)
- Menhir of Caramujeira
