= Lagoa de Dentro =

Coordinates: 6.67278°S 35.3789°W

- Municipality
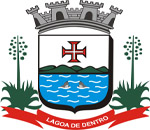
- Flag Coat of arms
- Interactive map of Lagoa de Dentro
- Country: Brazil
- Region: Northeast
- State: Paraíba
- Mesoregion: Agreste Paraibano

Population (2020)
  - Total: 7,737
- Time zone: UTC−3 (BRT)

Lagoa de Dentro (Central northeastern portuguese pronunciation: [lɐˈɡoɐ di ˈdẽtŭ]) is a municipality in the state of Paraíba in the Northeast Region of Brazil.

== See also ==
- List of municipalities in Paraíba
