= Carrapateira =

Carrapateira may refer to:

- Carrapateira, Paraíba, Brazil
- Carrapateira, Aljezur, Portugal
- Carrapateira, Vila Real de Santo Antonio, Portugal
