= Bordeira =

- Civil parish
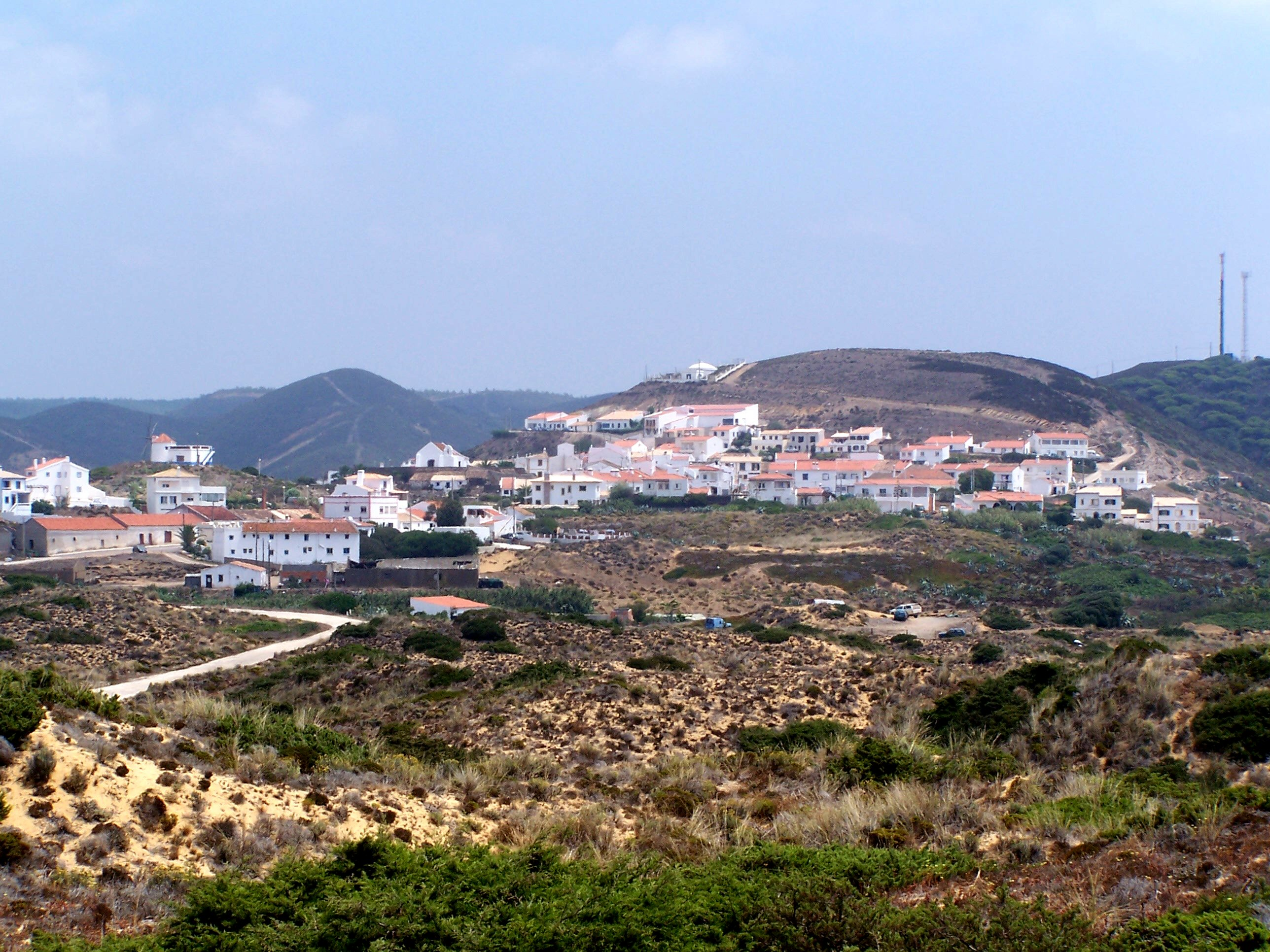
- The village of Carrapateira

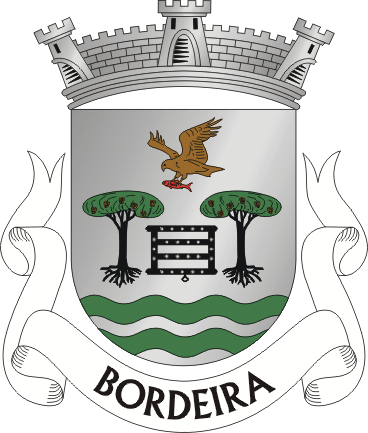
- Coat of arms

- Location in Portugal
- Coordinates: 37.196°N 8.861°W
- Country: Portugal
- Region: Algarve
- Intermunic. comm.: Algarve
- District: Faro
- Municipality: Aljezur

Area
  - Total: 79.87 km^{2} (30.84 sq mi)
- Elevation: 68 m (223 ft)

Population (2011)
  - Total: 432
  - Density: 5.41/km^{2} (14.0/sq mi)
- Time zone: UTC+00:00 (WET)
  - Summer (DST): UTC+01:00 (WEST)
- Postal code: 8670
- Area code: 282
- Patron: Nossa Senhora de Encarnação
- Website: http://www.cm-aljezur.pt/jfbordeira/

Bordeira is a Portuguese civil parish in the municipality of Aljezur. The population in 2011 was 432, in an area of 79.87 km^{2} (30.84 sq mi). It lies within the Southwest Alentejo and Vicentine Coast Natural Park, along the western coast of the Algarve in Faro District. The region, typical of the Algarve coastal areas, is dotted with many beaches, with the most important being the beaches of Praia do Amado and Praia da Bordeira, which attract both local and tourist vacationers. It contains the village of Carrapateira.

== History ==
Until 1837, the parishes of Carrapateira and Bordeira were actually separate ecclesiastical administrative divisions, of the neighbouring municipality of Vila do Bispo. When these two parishes were converted reallocated during the administrative reforms of Mouzinha de Silveira's government, they were integrated into one parish, and the parish transferred to the settlement of Bordeira which was more secular located in the interior.

== Geography ==
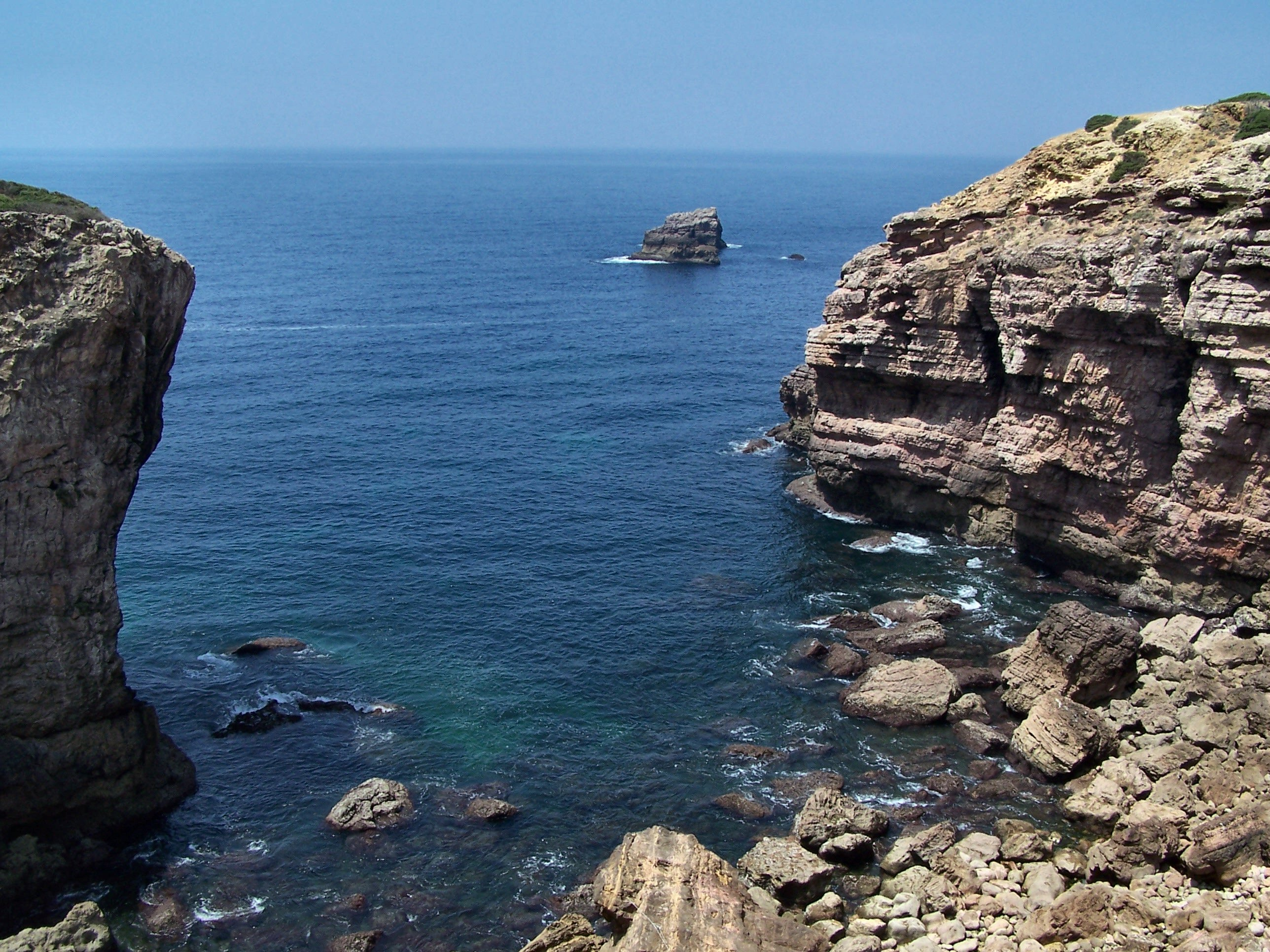
The ocean escarpment in the region of Pontal, along the coast of the civil parish of Bordeira

Population of Bordeira (1732 - 1837)
Year	Pop.	±%
1732	275	—
1756	193	−29.8%
1788		—
1802	298	—
1828	194	−34.9%
1835	330	+70.1%
1836	323	−2.1%
1837	402	+24.5%

The civil parish is located along the western coast of Portugal, in the southern limit of the municipality of Sabroa, bordered in the north by the civil parish of Aljezur, east by the parish of Bensafrim and south-east by the parish of Barão de São João (both in the municipality of Lagos and south by the parish of Vila do Bispo (in the municipality of the same name). It is highlighted by its small chapel, constructed after the 1755 earthquake and its following devastating tsunami (−29.8% lost their lives), heavily carved with gilded interior and retable. The church is dedicated to the patron, Nossa Senhora da Encarnação (Our Lady of the Incarnation).

Bordeira is better remembered for its beachfront and sand dunes, popular with surfers who visit Praia da Bordeira.

== Architecture ==
=== Civic ===
- Museu do Mar e da terra (Museum of the Sea and Land)

=== Religious ===
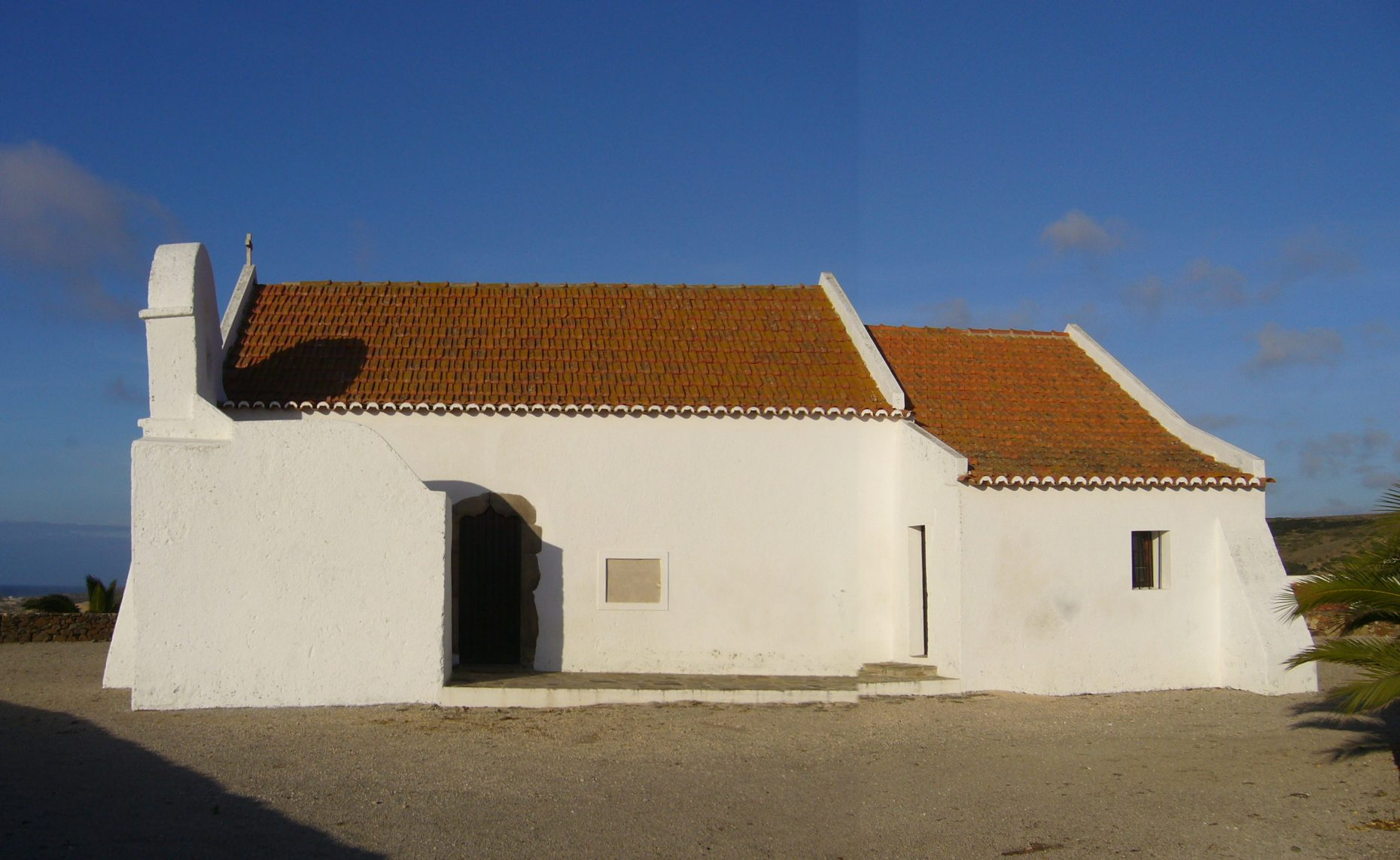
The 17th-century church in Carrapateira, dedicated to Nossa Senhora da Encarnação

.

- Chapel of Nossa Senhora de Fátima (Our Lady of Fatima) was inaugurated in May 1959.
- Church of Nossa Senhora da Encarnação (Our Lady of the Incarnation), or Matriz Church of Bordeira, was constructed following the 1755 earthquake and tsunami, in a simple style consisting of one nave, presented by a triumphal arch, high altar, with Baroque era styling, but with a Manueline-era portico that gives access to the local cemetery (which was not its original function);
- Church of Nossa Senhora da Conceição (and Fort of Carrapateira), the 17th-century fortress and religious platform that protected the village of Carrapateira until the end of the 18th century
