= Hermitage of Our Lady of Guadalupe =

Medieval chapel in Portugal

- Ermida de Nossa Senhora de Guadalupe
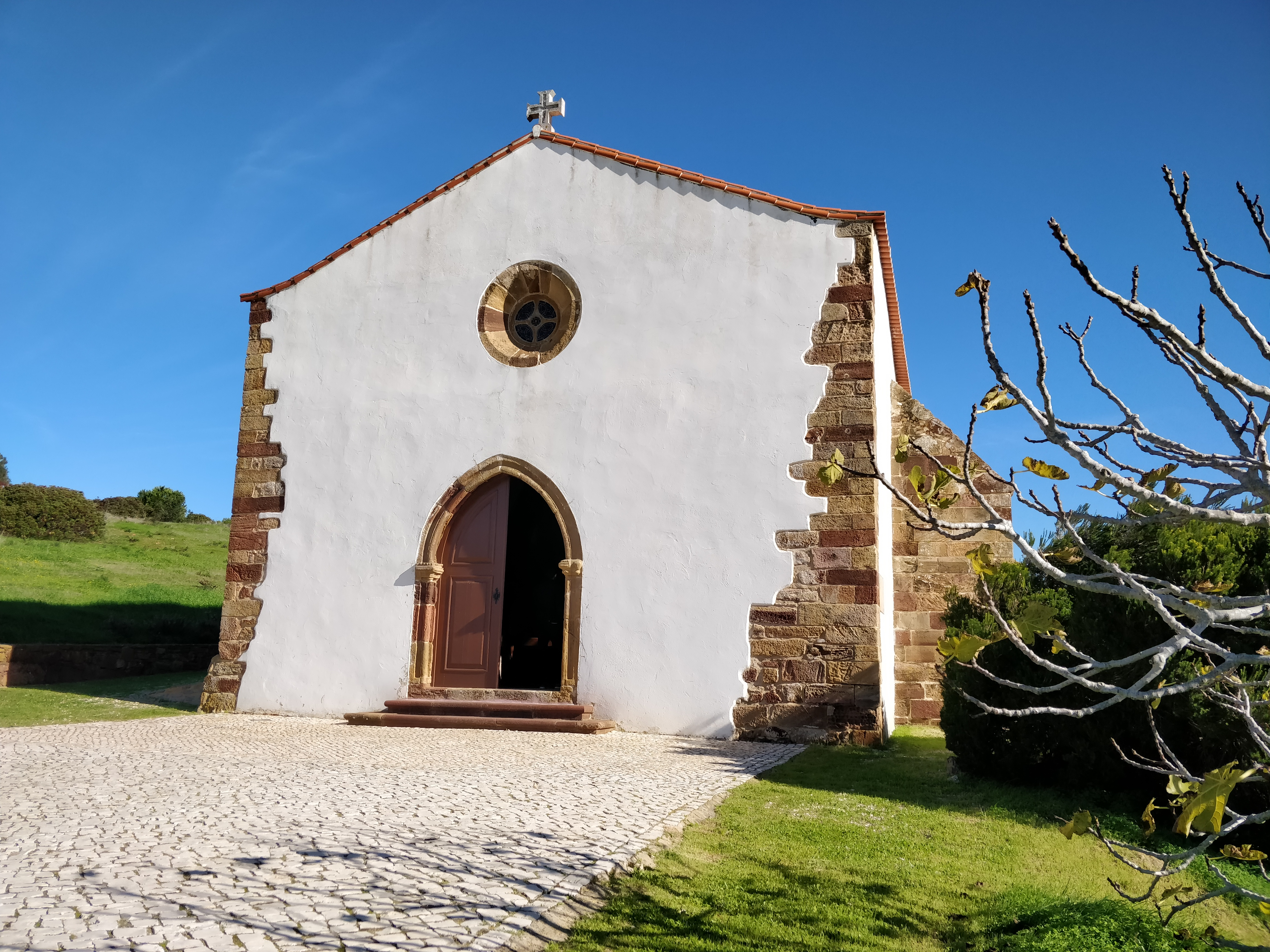
- Hermitage of Our Lady of Guadalupe
- 37°05′01″N 8°51′53″W
- Location: Vila do Bispo,
- Country: Portugal
- Denomination: Catholic Church in Portugal

Architecture
- Style: Romano-Gothic and Late Gothic
- Years built: uncertain

The Hermitage of Our Lady of Guadalupe (Portuguese: Ermida de Nossa Senhora de Guadalupe), also known as the Chapel of Our Lady of Guadalupe (Portuguese: Capela de Nossa Senhora de Guadalupe) is located between the towns of Budens and Raposeira, in the Municipality of Vila do Bispo, Faro District, in the Algarve region of Portugal. It is particularly well known as a supposed location where the pioneer navigator Prince Henry the Navigator (1394–1460) used to pray. In addition to a chapel, there is a small museum dedicated to Prince Henry.

== History ==
The chapel is constructed from local sandstone, which is whitewashed. It has a rectangular plan with a single nave supported by buttresses in the Romano-Gothic style. In the main chapel, there is a vault supported by eight columns with capitals adorned with branches, shells, human heads and foliage, which are among the most realistic works of this type in Portugal. Two gargoyles spout rainwater from the sacristy roof through the wall on the south side and over the vestry. Above the doorway is a small rose window. The chapel is one of the rare extant examples of medieval architecture in the Algarve, due to the fact that it survived the 1755 earthquake, and it is the oldest religious building in the region. It was one of the first churches in Portugal to be dedicated to Our Lady of Guadalupe. Considering its relative remoteness, this is a large building, in which it is believed that 400 people could have attended Mass. The chapel was declared a National Monument in 1924.

Based on an architectural style that employs buttresses and presents an austere appearance, the chapel is considered by some that its likely to have been built by the Knights Templar during the time of King Denis in the second half of the 13th century and only dedicated later to Our Lady of Guadalupe. However, an alternative view is that it was built after the so-called miracle of Our Lady of Guadalupe, which occurred early in the 14th century in Spain. There is evidence of construction in the 15th century because of the use of late-Gothic features reminiscent of the nearby Silves Cathedral, but some commentators consider these to be the result of subsequent alterations rather than indicative of the time of original construction.

The exact connection with Prince Henry the Navigator, known in Portugal as the Infante Dom Henrique, who was the fourth child of King John I of Portugal, is unclear. Henry was instrumental in sending out the first Portuguese navigators to explore the west coast of Africa and look for a direct sea route to India and the Far East. There are many reports of his having prayed at the chapel.
