= Carrapateira, Aljezur =

Carrapateira
- Village
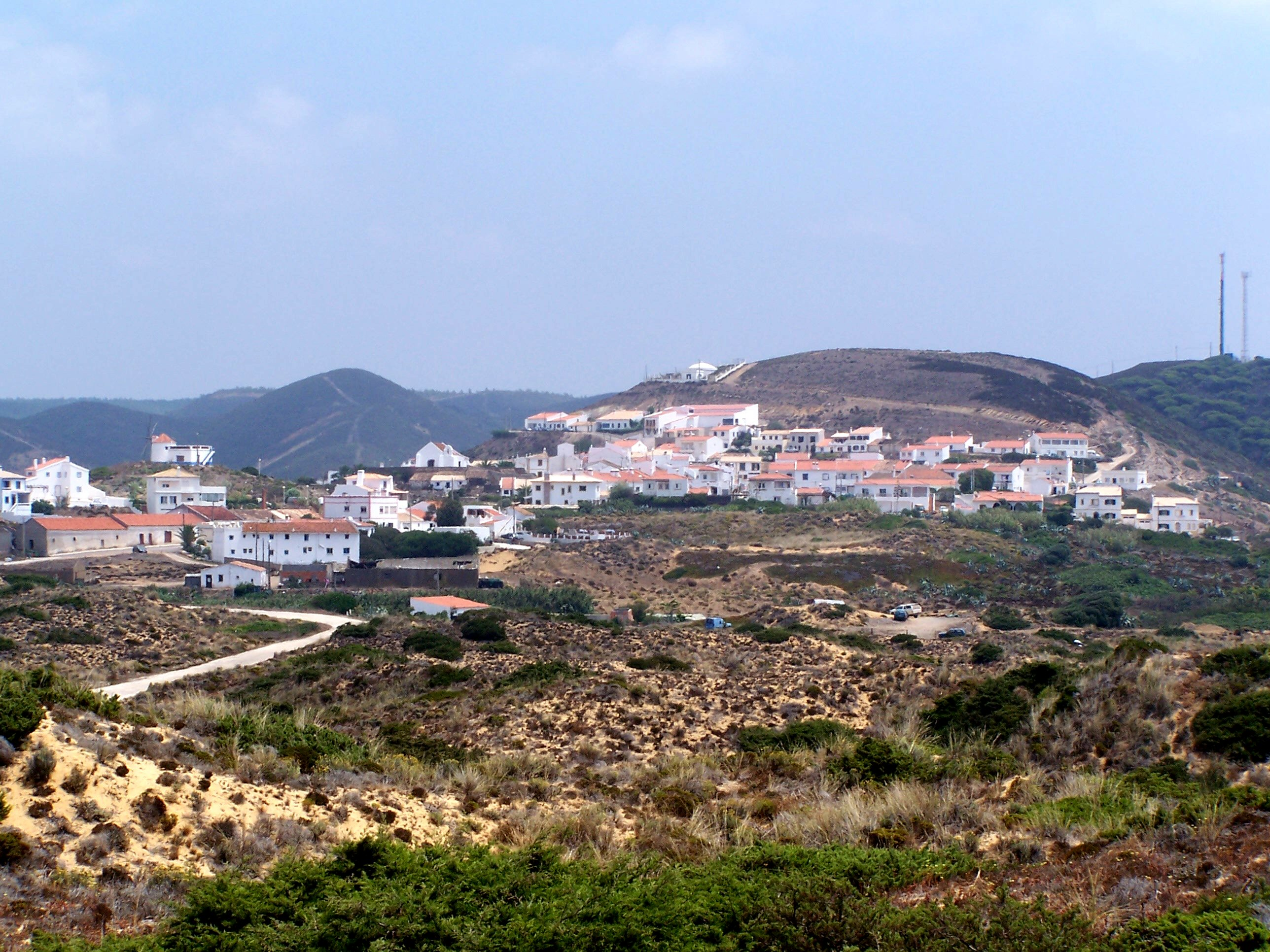

- Location in Portugal
- Coordinates: 37°11′02″N 8°53′43″W
- Country: Portugal
- Region: Algarve
- District: Faro
- Municipality: Aljezur
- Civil parish: Bordeira

Carrapateira is a village on the western coast of the Algarve, Portugal. Administratively, it is part of the civil parish of Bordeira, within the municipality of Aljezur, in the Faro District. Its landmarks include an old fort and a church. The nearby beaches are a popular surfing destination.

== Geography ==
Carrapateira lies 35.6 kilometres (22.1 mi) by road northwest of Lagos and 110 kilometres (68 mi) northwest of Faro. It is located along the N268 road. To the northeast is the village of Bordeira while the village of Vilarinha lies to the southeast. A small stream named Ribeira da Carrapateira flows through the village, and it is surrounded by the Southwest Alentejo and Vicentine Coast Natural Park.

Situated in a hilly, dry and barren area, with only a small river and a few wells, Carrapeteira never supported a large population. It was traditionally a hamlet conjoined in a single parish with nearby Raposeira, dependent on the municipality of Vila do Bispo (until 1855) and then Lagos. In September 1861, the parish of Carrapateira was conjoined to Bordeira, both deducted from Lagos and transferred to the municipality of Alzejur.

Carrapateira sits on a small indented headland of limestone cliffs on the western Vincentine coast of the Algarve. Carrapateira point, or Pontal, was a traditional danger for sailing ships, its high reddish rock formations looking deceptively similar to Cape St. Vincent, the southwest corner of Portugal's coast some eleven miles further south. The extremely fast southbound current and the jutting headland that made it a dangerous lure for shipwrecks in the past also creates the conditions which have made it a popular surfing destination in recent years. To the north of the Carrapateira headland is the vast Praia da Bordeira, regarded as one of the best beaches in Portugal, "noted for its rugged limestone cliffs and extensive sand dunes". to the south is the Praia do Amado, highly popular with surfers. The village contains the Carrapateira Surfhouse, offering surf courses for beginners and guided surf tours.

== Landmarks ==
In the 17th century, raids by Barbary pirates on this stretch of coast prompted a petition by local residents for protection. A small fort was erected on an overseeing hill in 1673 by Nuno da Cunha de Ataíde, Count of Pontével, the Governor and Captain-General of the Algarve. The walls of the fort were built to enclose the pre-existing parish church of Nossa Senhora da Conceição, a structure of popular Algarvian design with some Manueline traces dating from the 16th century. In 1742, during the reign of John V, the fort was rebuilt on the orders of Jerónimo de Ataíde, Count of Atouguia, governor of the Algarve. It was a square fortress with a bastion on each corner, typically defended by six coastal cannons or mortars. In the aftermath of the 1755 Lisbon earthquake, the church suffered some damage, which was the beginning of the structure's slow deterioration. Despite occasional repairs, by 1792 the fort was reported to be in ruins and the cannons unserviceable. It was decommissioned by 1822.

Excavations carried out in 2001 to the southwest of the town identified a small fishing village dating back to the 12th and 13th centuries at the end of the period of Muslim occupation in the Algarve.

== Gallery ==
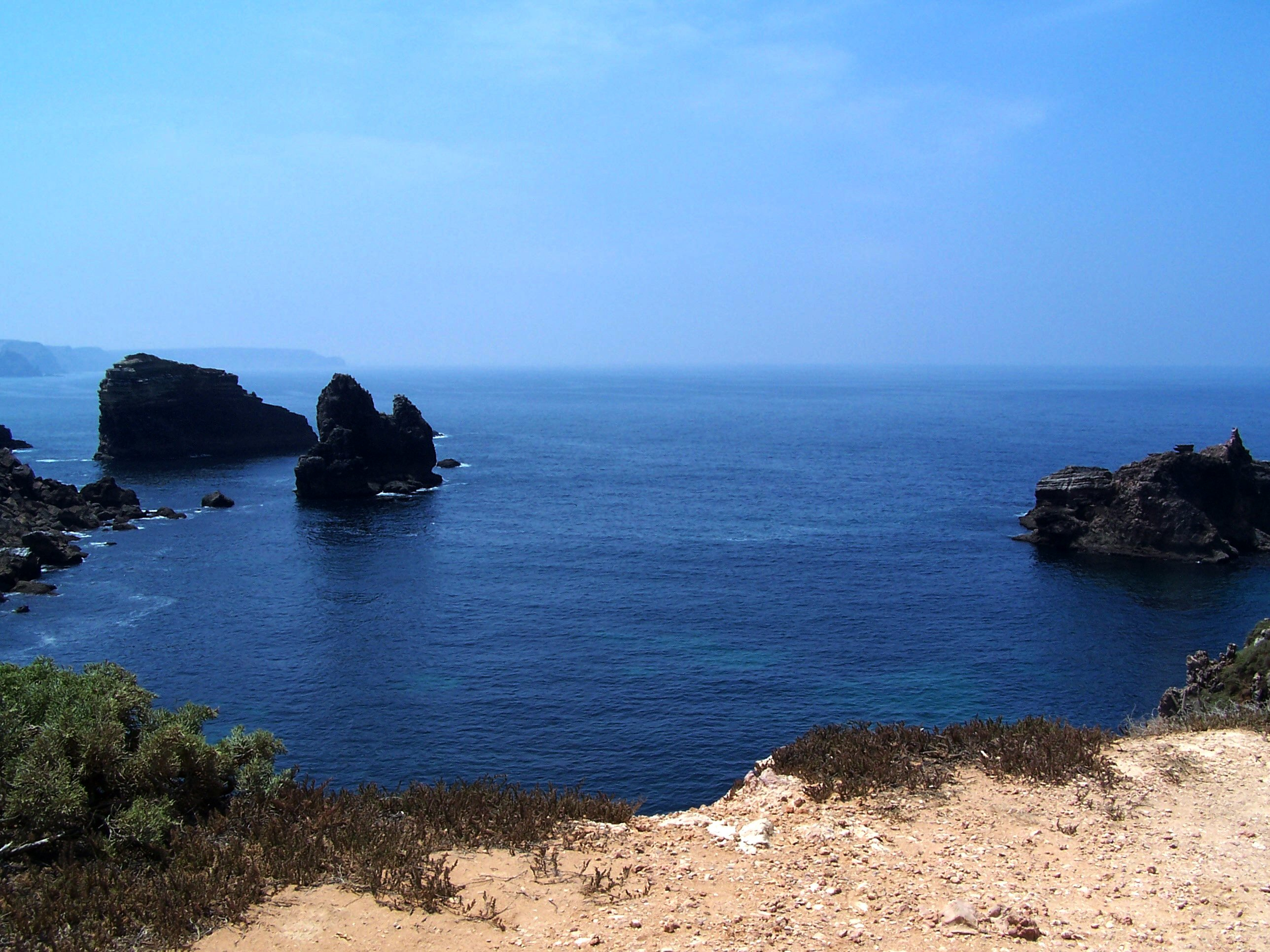
Pontal of Carrapateira

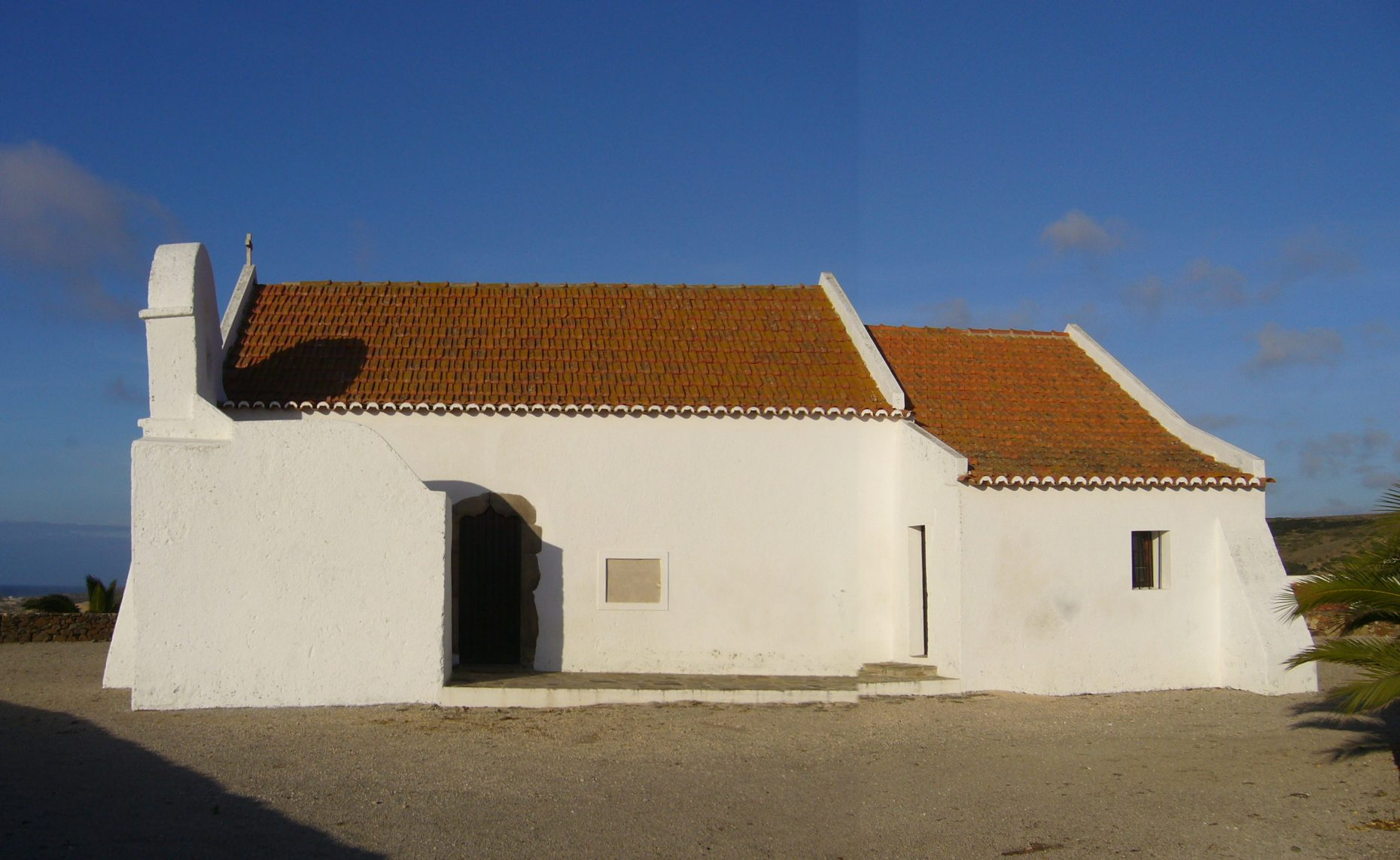
Carrapateira's church

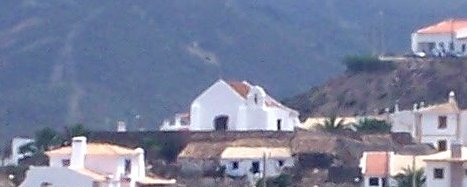
Carrapateira's fort

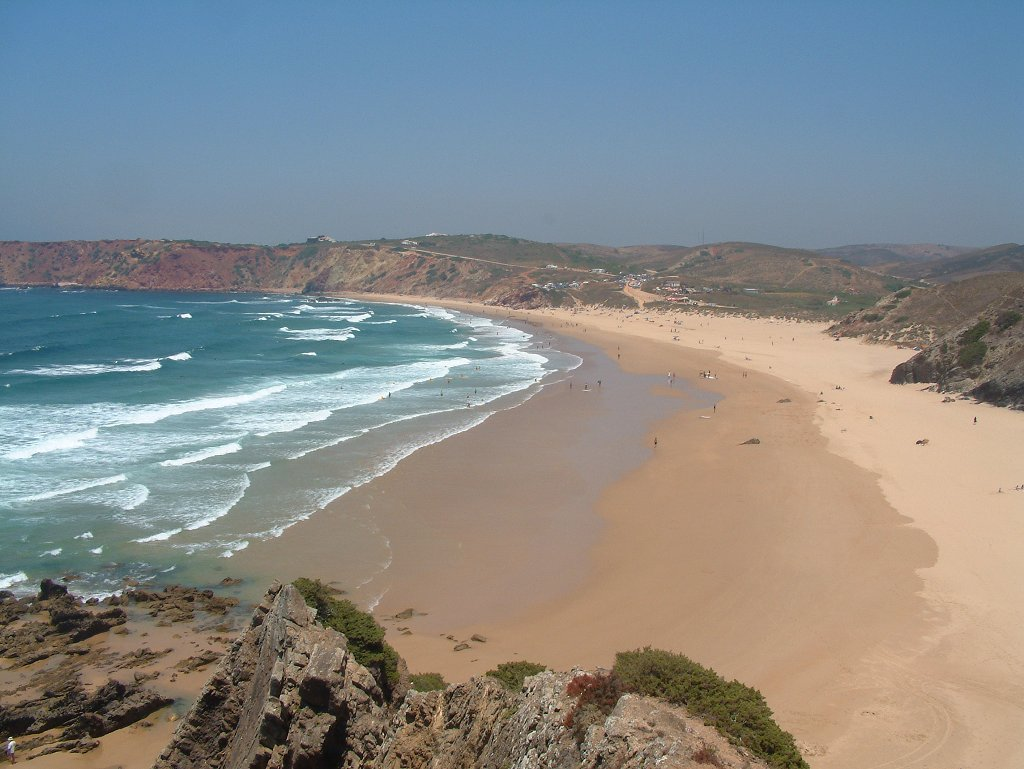
Praia do Amado, with the Pontal cliffs in the distance

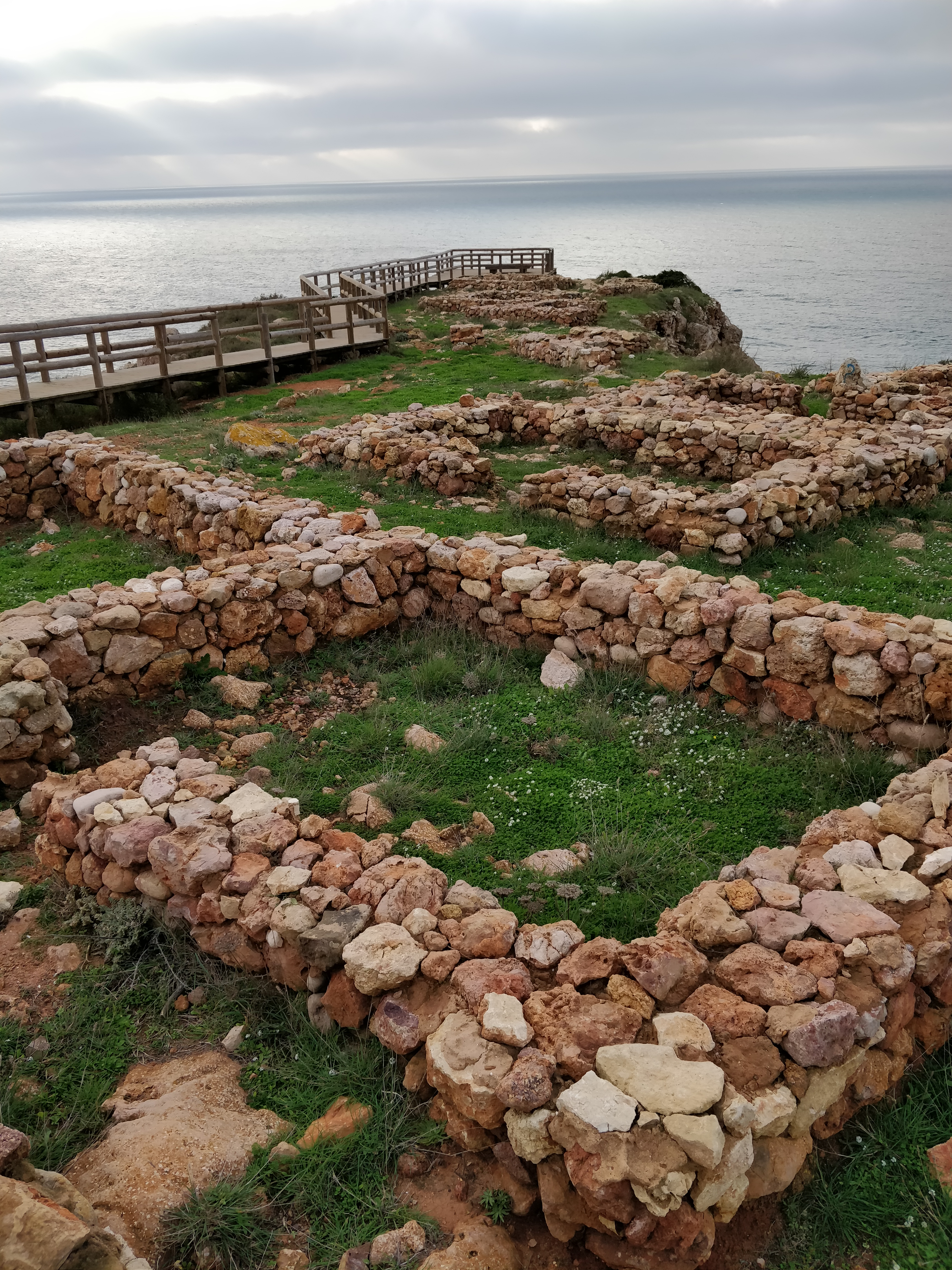
Islamic fishing village
