= Menhirs of Padrão =

Prehistoric standing stones in the Algarve, Portugal

- Menires do Padrão
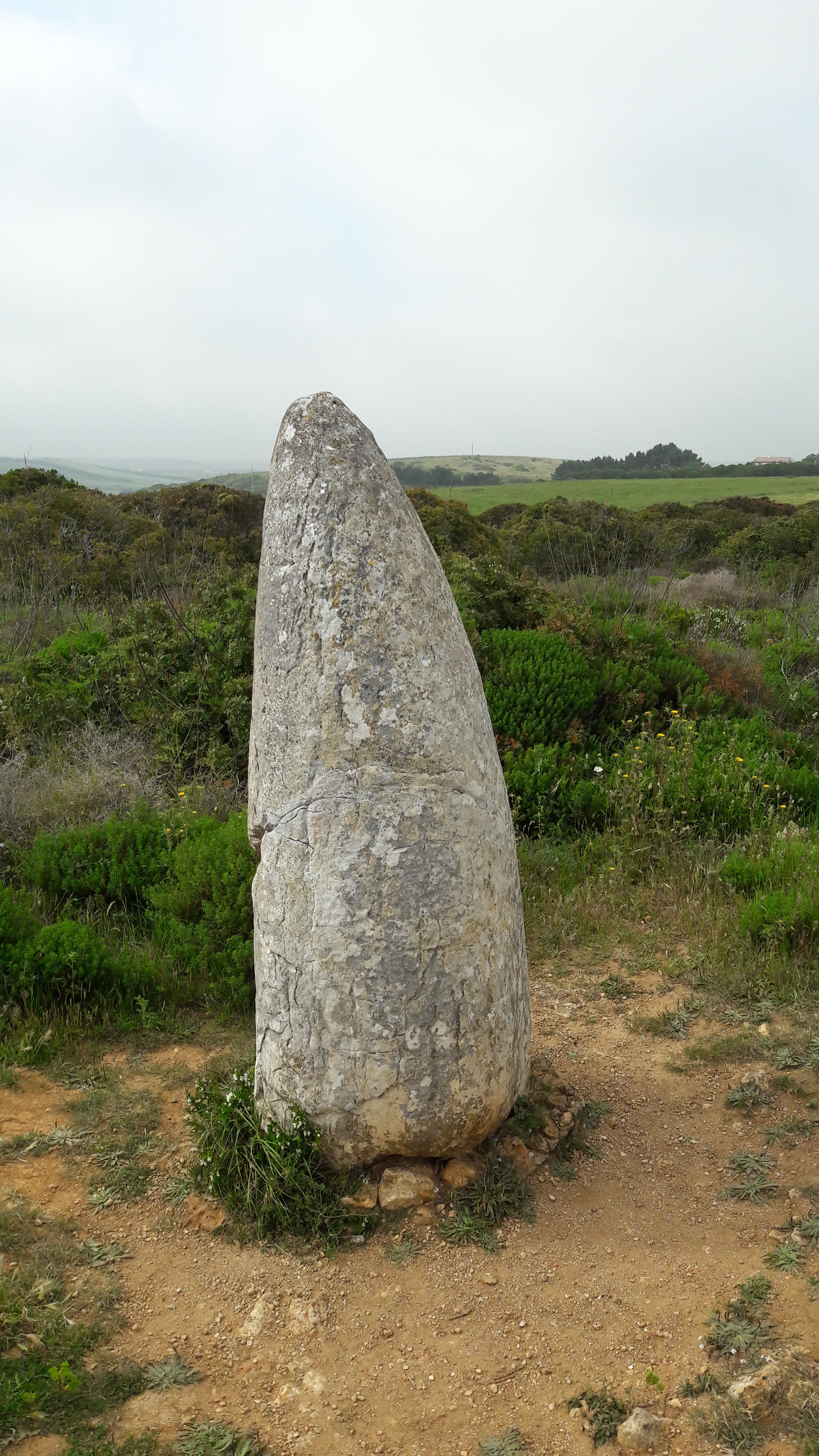
- The Padrão Menhir
- Interactive map of Menhirs of Padrão
- 37°03′46″N 8°53′18″W
- Type: Standing stones
- Periods: Neolithic, reused until mid-13th century CE
- Location: Vila do Bispo, Faro District, Portugal

History
- Built: c. 4500 BCE

Site notes
- Excavation dates: 1984–; 1994
- Discovered: 1979
- Condition: Only one of 15 stones is in situ
- Public access: Yes

The Menhirs of Padrão are a group of fifteen megalithic menhirs located in the municipality of Vila do Bispo, in the Faro District of the Algarve region of Portugal. It is believed that they originally formed a large cromlech, or stone circle. An alternative interpretation is that they served as territorial possession markers. Evidence suggests that the site was more or less continuously occupied from the time of construction in around 4500 BCE, to the end of Muslim occupation of Portugal in the middle of the 13th century CE.

== Description ==
The menhirs, probably erected during the Neolithic-Chalcolithic period, are situated in the Padrão area of Vila do Bispo, south of the village of Raposeira. The best-preserved example, known as the Padrão Menhir, is located near the road between Raposeira and Praia da Ingrina, which divides the site. Each of the fifteen menhirs was situated on a different hilltop, allowing for a view of the surrounding coastal area as far as Sagres. They were all carved from white limestone and had conical, subcylindrical, oval, or parallelepiped shapes, with varied heights between 0.65 and 3 metres. Some of them have decorative elements, consisting of cup marks and cords. The Padrão Menhir is decorated with a barely noticeable ring in relief at the top, a symbol that has also been found on other menhirs in the region and is interpreted to have been used to make the menhir represent a phallus. The Padrão Menhir is the only one that is standing. All the others have fallen and some are in pieces. The Menhirs of Padrão are situated close to other prehistoric monuments, such as the Menhirs of Milrei and the Menhir of Aspradantes.

The menhir given the number 9 is one of those that are fragmented. It is of particular interest because its base is formed by a subcircular stone structure, about 5 metres in diameter, consisting of blocks of limestone, sandstone, and greywacke. A large number of findings were made at this particular site, including percussion tools, flint flakes, and remains of ceramic vessels from the prehistoric period. A possible intentional deposit was also discovered, which included a ceramic vessel and cockle and limpet shells. Close to menhirs 1 and 2, an area rich in grave goods was found, including a combustion structure and a paving stone from the early Neolithic period, building materials from Roman and late-Roman periods, and a necropolis used during the Visigothic and Islamic Gharb Al-Andalus periods. The dating of the grave goods allows us to identify a continuity of occupation and its incorporation into Mozarabic communities.

The Menhirs of Padrão are just a few of the estimated 250-300 menhirs found in Vila do Bispo, in an area of just 42 km2, the highest concentration of prehistoric monuments in the Iberian Peninsula.

== Excavations ==
The menhirs were identified by Eduardo Prescott Vicente and Adolfo Silveira Martins, and archaeological excavations were subsequently carried out at the site by Mário Varela Gomes. The Padrão Menhir was re-erected in 1984, after excavations. In 1994, new excavations were carried out, during which the remains of an ancient settlement from around 4500 BCE during the Neolithic period were found. This suggests that the main menhir may be one of the oldest in Western Europe. Several tombs from the late Roman and medieval periods were also discovered, probably having been installed there due to the presence of the prehistoric monuments. Two of the menhirs are held in the Vila do Bispo museum, together with many of the findings during the excavations.

== Classification ==
On 6 July 1983, the Ministry of Culture issued a decree on the joint classification of the Padrão and Milrei menhirs, following an opinion from the Provisional National Commission of Archaeology, but this process eventually lapsed without being completed. In September 2010, the Regional Director of Culture for the Algarve announced her intention to finalize the classification processes for the various properties in the region that had already been approved as being of Public or National Interest, with only the final opinion of the Institute for the Management of Architectural and Archaeological Heritage and its publication in the Official Gazette remaining. However, as of April 2026, the complex still lacked legal protection.
