= Islamic Fishing Village, Carrapateira =

Archaeological site near Carrapateira, Portugal

Islamic Fishing Village, Carrapateira, Portugal
- Povoado Islâmico de Pescadores
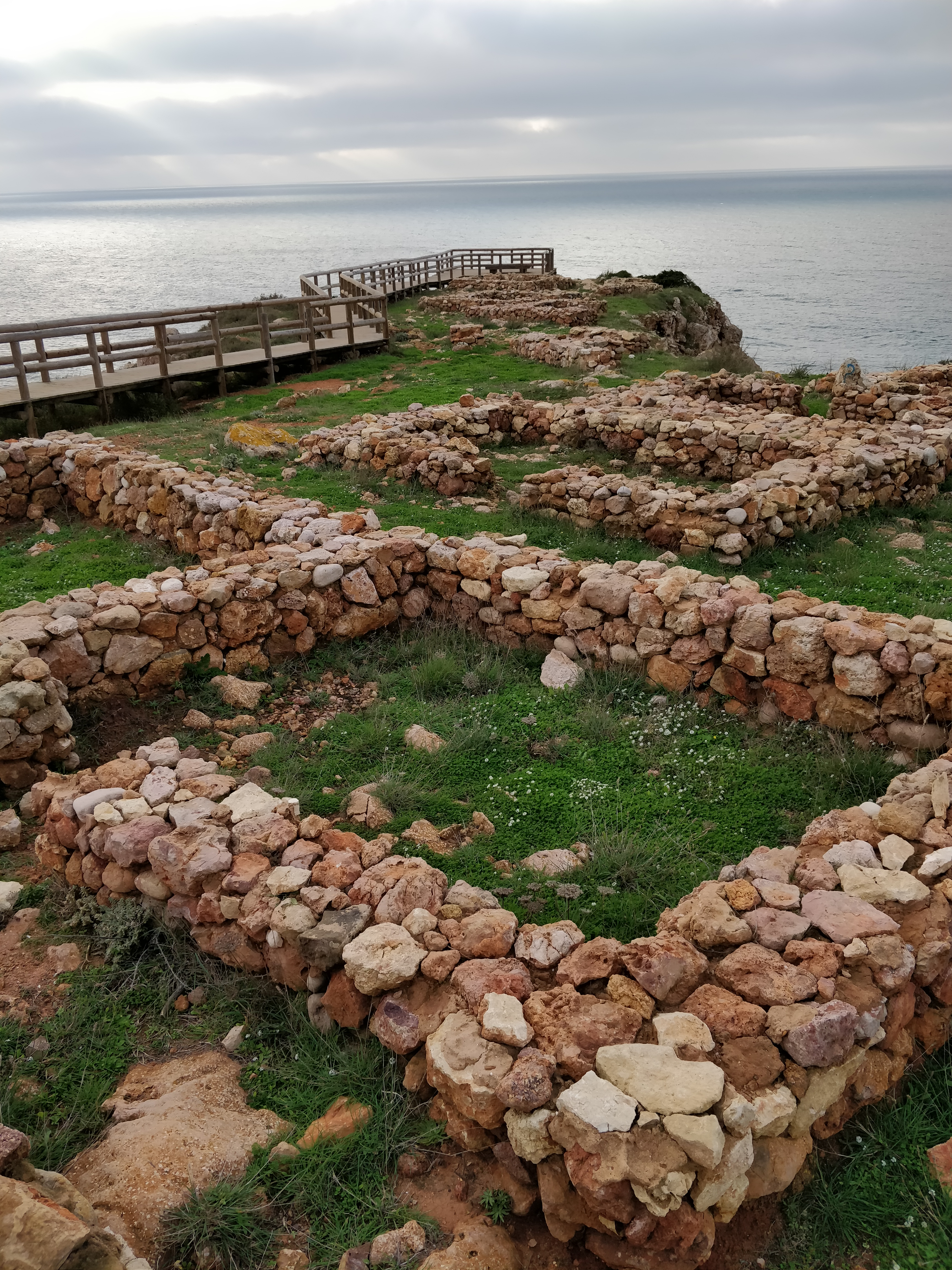
- Interactive map of Islamic Fishing Village, Carrapateira, Portugal
- 37°10′23″N 8°54′28″W
- Periods: Islamic occupation of Iberia
- Location: Portugal
- Region: Algarve

Site notes
- Elevation: 30 m (98 ft)
- Excavation dates: 2001
- Archaeologists: Professor Rosa Varela Gomes, Universidade Nova de Lisboa.
- Public access: Yes

The Islamic Fishing Village (Portuguese: Povoado Islâmico de Pescadores) is an archaeological site close to the town of Carrapateira in the municipality of Aljezur, Algarve Region of Portugal. The site was excavated by a team of researchers from the New University of Lisbon in 2001. This permitted the settlement to be dated to the 12th and 13th centuries, during the Almohad Caliphate at the end of the Muslim occupation of the Algarve.

The village is located high above the sea, south-west of Carrapateira. Items found that date back to the 12th century, and the location of the village, indicate that it served as a seasonal fishing village that also carried out some agriculture and animal rearing. Such an agro-maritime economy was still found on the Portuguese Atlantic coast until recently. It is believed that fishing and shellfish harvesting were not only the main food source of the residents of this village, but that salted and dried fish were traded with inland farmers in exchange for cereals and other products.

The housing structures measured an average of 3.8 metres by 2.0 metres and were constructed of mud and stone. Remains of burned items and broken ceramics, as well as hooks, weights for fishing nets and marine and terrestrial fauna have been found. Included in the discoveries was a whale bone of around half a metre in length, which could have been used as a bench. The location of this settlement on a promontory exposed to almost year-round strong winds, together with the small size of the houses, suggests that it functioned as a lookout point, perhaps for whaling purposes. Whales were abundant at the time of the Muslim occupation. An initial assumption that it was an observation point for defensive purposes was discounted after the excavations.

== Sources ==
- Gomes, Rosa Varela; Teixeira, Vera; Miranda, Maria João, "Povoado Muçulmano na Ponta do Castelo (Aljezur), Notícia Preliminar", in Al-madan nº 10, pp. 200–201, December 2001
