= Iládio Amado =

Portuguese music education teacher, musician and composer

- Born: 1976 (age 49–50); Portugal
- Occupations: Musician, composer, music educator
- Notable work: O Julgamento do Cuco (2000); A Celebração da Primavera (2004); Corolário (2010)
- Awards: Honourable Mention, Festa Grande C National Creativity Contest (2011)

Iládio Amado (born 1976, Portugal) is a music education teacher, musician and composer. He lives in Vila do Bispo, Algarve, Portugal and has performed as a member of various bands. He is currently a member of Tokamaki.

== Career ==
Before settling with Tokamaki, Amado was part of the bands Blue Smile, Living Ashes, PF! and the University of Lisbon's Tuna. In 1999, he was part of two collective contemporary art exhibitions: Ramaia at the Public Equipment for Cultural Action (EPAC) centre in Vila do Bispo and RAMa at Galeria Alvarez in Porto. He then composed two children's ballets, the first being O Julgamento do Cuco in 2000 for the Association of Parents of the Schools of Castelo de Vide with choreographer Maria João Alcobia. The second was A Celebração da Primavera for 1st Cycle students in Arronches in 2004.

In 2005, he co-authored ambient noise with André "Igor" Teresinha for a permanent exhibit at the Museu do Rio in Alcoutim and in 2009 arranged and produced music for Helena Tapadinhas' Contos do Mago. This was produced under the Environmental Education Program through Art and presented at Parque das Nações during the close of the International Year of Planet Earth, an event sponsored by the United Nations and UNESCO. In 2010, he collaborated with poet Bruno Filipe Esteves for the project A Palavra Longe de Aberta.

In 2010 and 2014, he was a guest jury member for the Vila do Bispo Fado Competition. in Vila do Bispo. He released his solo album, Corolário, on Bandcamp in 2010. He received an honourable mention at the Festa Grande C National Creativity Contest for the Schools in the music category in 2011. In 2014, he made 21 radio advertisements for the Commission for the Protection of Children and Youth (Comissões de Proteção de Crianças e Jovens) with students from the Monchique School Group for the inaugural International Day to Defend Children's Rights.

== Discography ==
=== Original soundtracks ===
Year	Title	Director	Screenings	Notes	Ref
2011	Faminto	Hernâni Duarte Maria, Pedro Noel da Luz	CinEuphoria 2012, Shortcutz Porto, Cinemateca Portuguesa, FICSAM, LAMA de Curtas, BragaCine Shortcutz Lisbon, Avanca Film Festival, Festival de Curtas-Metragens de Faro, Arouca Film Festival, BragaCine	Awarded the 13th edition of Sé Video	
2011	Drink!	Tiago Inácio	Arouca Film Festival, Portugal Underground Film Festival, BragaCine FISCAM		
2011	Memórias da Nossa Senhora da Guadalupe	Hernâni Duarte Maria, Raquel Roxo and Elsa Freixial	European Heritage Days	Documentary made for the Secretary of State for Culture (Algarve)	
2013	Beatriz	Paradoxon Producões	Festival de Curtas-Metragens de Faro, Arouca Film Festival		
2013	Tesouras e Navalhas	Hernâni Duarte Maria	Library António Ramos Rosa, Festival de Curtas-Metragens de Faro, Figueira Film Art, Arouca Film Festival	Performed with Tokamaki and by himself for the film	
