= Vila do Bispo (parish) =

- Civil parish
- Location in Portugal
- Coordinates: 37.0826°N 8.9114°W
- Country: Portugal
- Region: Algarve
- Intermunic. comm.: Algarve
- District: Faro
- Municipality: Vila do Bispo
- Disbanded: 2013
- Time zone: UTC+00:00 (WET)
  - Summer (DST): UTC+01:00 (WEST)
- Postal code: 8650-416
- Area code: 282

Vila do Bispo is a former civil parish in the municipality of Vila do Bispo, in the southern Algarve, Portugal. In 2013, the parish merged into the new parish Vila do Bispo e Raposeira.
