= Vila do Bispo e Raposeira =

- Civil parish
- Location in Portugal
- Coordinates: 37.083°N 8.910°W
- Country: Portugal
- Region: Algarve
- Intermunic. comm.: Algarve
- District: Faro
- Municipality: Vila do Bispo

Area
  - Total: 84.22 km^{2} (32.52 sq mi)

Population (2011)
  - Total: 1,378
  - Density: 16.36/km^{2} (42.38/sq mi)
- Time zone: UTC+00:00 (WET)
  - Summer (DST): UTC+01:00 (WEST)

Location in the municipality of Vila do Bispo

Vila do Bispo e Raposeira is a civil parish in the municipality of Vila do Bispo, Portugal. It was formed in 2013 by the merger of the former parishes Vila do Bispo and Raposeira. The population in 2011 was 1,378, in an area of 84.22 km².
