= Barão de São Miguel =

- Civil parish
- Location in Portugal
- Coordinates: 37°06′N 8°48′W
- Country: Portugal
- Region: Algarve
- Intermunic. comm.: Algarve
- District: Faro
- Municipality: Vila do Bispo

Area
  - Total: 14.86 km^{2} (5.74 sq mi)
- Elevation: 20 m (66 ft)

Population (2011)
  - Total: 451
  - Density: 30.3/km^{2} (78.6/sq mi)
- Time zone: UTC+00:00 (WET)
  - Summer (DST): UTC+01:00 (WEST)
- Postal code: 8650-451

Location in the municipality of Vila do Bispo

Barão de São Miguel is a village and civil parish (freguesia) located in Portugal’s western Algarve. Administratively, it is part of the municipality (município) of Vila do Bispo.

== Geography ==
The village is located in the Vale de Barão on the road between Budens and Barão de São João. It lies 5 km (3.1 mi) north of the fishing village of Burgau and 18 km (11 mi) from Vila do Bispo, its administrative centre. Barão de São Miguel is just outside of the boundary of the Southwest Alentejo and Vicentine Coast Natural Park.

== Vital statistics ==
The area of the civil parish of Barão de São Miguel is 14.86 km^{2} (5.74 sq mi). In 2011 it had 451 inhabitants (231 males and 220 females).

Population of Barão de São Miguel Civil Parish
1930	1940	1950	1960	1970	1981	1991	2001	2011
556	626	634	597	502	368	436	440	451

== Buildings ==
Barão de São Miguel resembles many rural villages in the Algarve. Its housing stock mainly consists of small white houses with traditional chimneys, a domestic architectural style influenced by the Moorish occupation of the area up to the thirteenth century.

The village church was constructed in the sixteenth century and features a tower and just a single nave. Its baroque high altar is dedicated to the Archangel Michael.

Near to the N125 to the south of the village, lime kilns are to be found. These were originally constructed to supply the nearby city of Lagos.
