= Burgau, Portugal =

Burgau
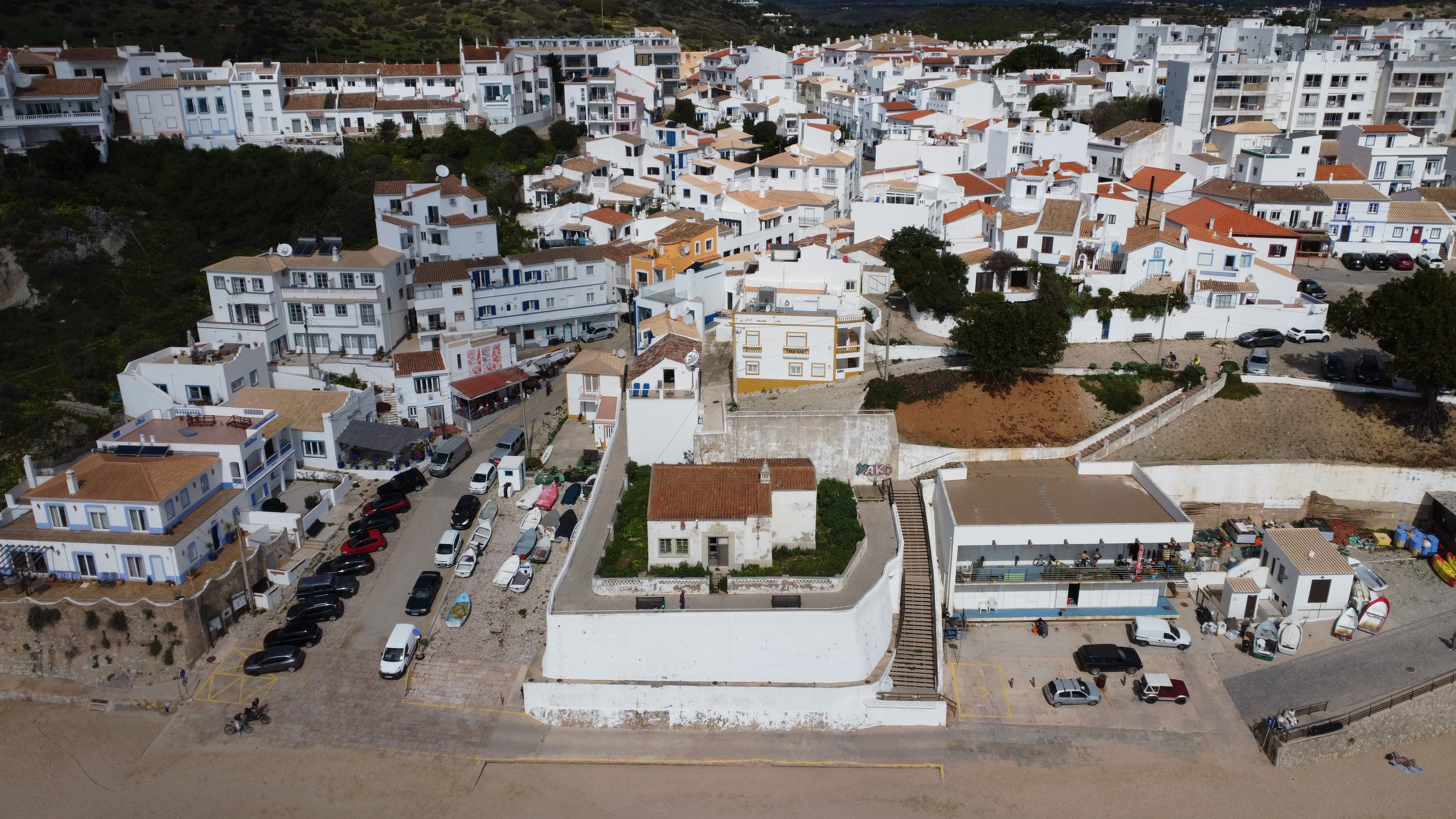
- Interactive map of Burgau
- Coordinates: 37.07358°N 8.77456°W
- Country: Portugal
- Region: Algarve

Burgau, located in the western region of the Algarve, under the municipality of Vila do Bispo, is a former fishing village. Now living mainly on tourism, its most notable attraction is the small beach of Praia de Burgau, surrounded by cliffs that protect it from the frequent strong wind characteristic of Barlavento.

The area retains a strong local Portuguese presence, as well as international residents, largely owing to the presence of the Vale Verde International School. The peak-season brings in a number of tourists due to the available amenities, hotel and a number of small apartments that can be rented during the summer. The village has approximately 250 residents.

In 2010, Burgau was voted by readers of the Lonely Planet as the "quaintest beachside village" in Europe.

== Attractions ==
The beach Praia de Burgau enjoys clear waters because of its size and the climate in the region. Around the area, people can walk in the fields belonging to the protected area and appreciate the natural landscape of Barlavento Algarvio. The peak season (June - September) attracts a number of tourists due to its bars and cafes, creating a family friendly atmosphere.

In the past few years, an influx of wild camping has blighted the area but after a strong campaign by locals and council officials, this has recently been brought under control.
