= Carrapateira, Vila Real de Santo Antonio =

Carrapateira
- Village
- Location in Portugal
- Coordinates: 37°15′N 7°34′W
- Country: Portugal
- Region: Algarve
- District: Faro
- Municipality: Vila Real de Santo António
- Civil parish: Vila Real de Santo António

Carrapateira is a village in Vila Real de Santo António Municipality, Algarve, Portugal. It is located to the northwest of Ayamonte.
