= Raposeira =

- Civil parish
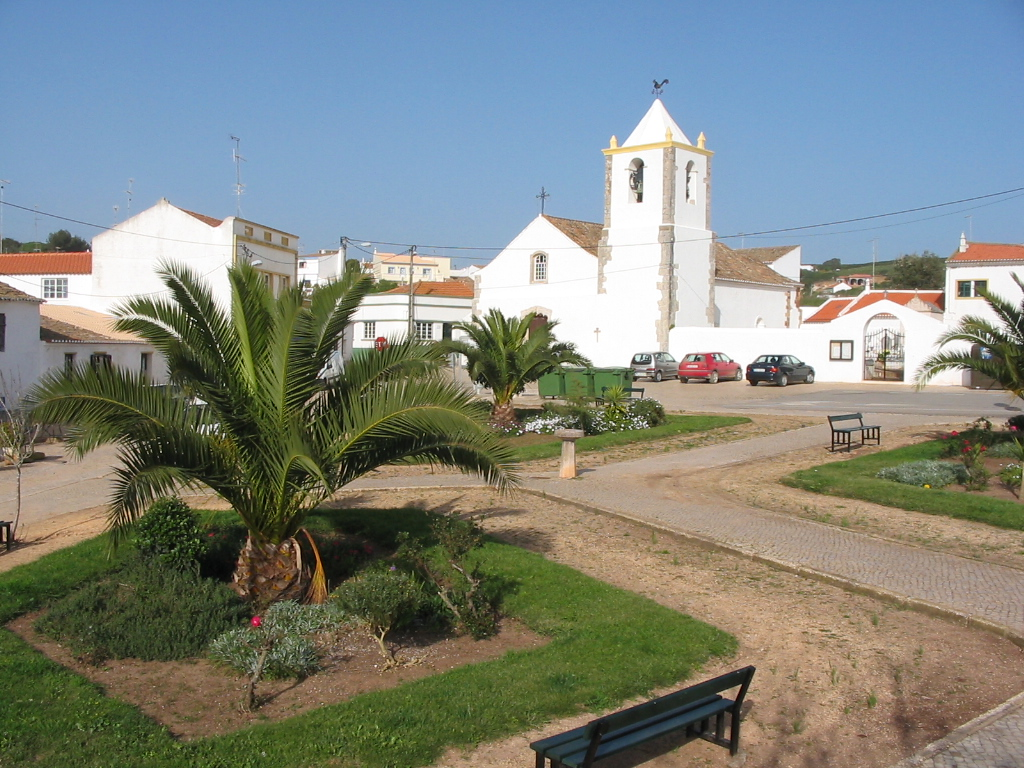
- Church of Raposeira

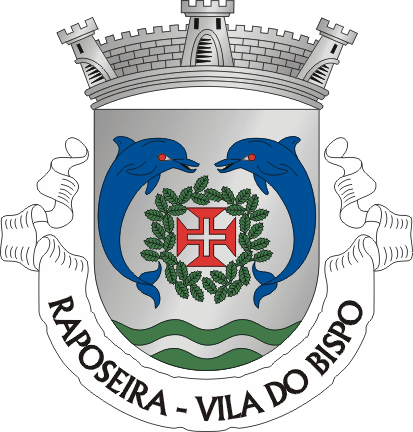
- Coat of arms

- Location in Portugal
- Coordinates: 37°05′02″N 8°53′21″W
- Country: Portugal
- Region: Algarve
- Intermunic. comm.: Algarve
- District: Faro
- Municipality: Vila do Bispo
- Disbanded: 2013

Area
  - Total: 25.71 km^{2} (9.93 sq mi)

Population (2001)
  - Total: 441
  - Density: 17.2/km^{2} (44.4/sq mi)
- Time zone: UTC+00:00 (WET)
  - Summer (DST): UTC+01:00 (WEST)

Raposeira is a village and former civil parish in the municipality of Vila do Bispo, District of Faro, in Algarve region, Portugal. It is told that it is named after fox because raposa means fox in Portuguese. In 2013, the parish merged into the new parish Vila do Bispo e Raposeira. It has an area of 25.71 km^{2} and 441 inhabitants (2001).

It is one of the parishes covered by the Southwest Alentejo and Vicentine Coast Natural Park.

Raposeira was one of the places where the 15th-century Portuguese prince Henry the Navigator set up residence during his lifetime. Henry was known to have attended mass at the isolated but spacious chapel dedicated to the cult of Our Lady of Guadalupe, believed to have been originally erected by the Templar knights in the latter part the 13th century, and one of the few Medieval structures in this region of the Algarve to have survived the 1755 earthquake intact.

There are several groups of megalithic menhirs on the way to the beach. It became a hotspot for national and international road travellers, campers and surfers, and many foreigners have done retirement settlement there. People from Germany, England and Netherlands can be found in the area, as well as from the rest of Europe. The place is windy in summer. Wind blows mostly from two sides: cold wind blows from Monchique a nearby area popular for medronho (a very strong local alcoholic drink) but on the other side, coming from Morocco, a hot wind blows.

In the centre of Raposeira, local Portuguese bars, a small cafe restaurant and a pizza restaurant can be found. The village is usually very quiet and peaceful. Bus transport to Sagres and Vila do Bispo is available from 6:00 in the morning to 8:00 in the evening, sometimes differing on public holidays.

== Patrimony ==
- Menhir of Aspradantes
- Hermitage of Our Lady of Guadalupe
- Igreja da Raposeira
- Casa do Infante
- Battery of Zavial
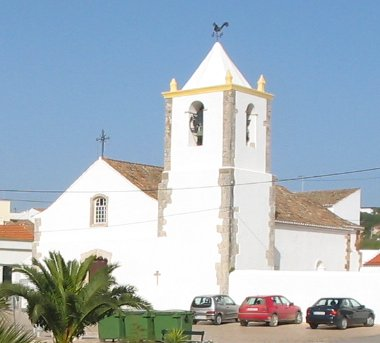
Church of Raposeira

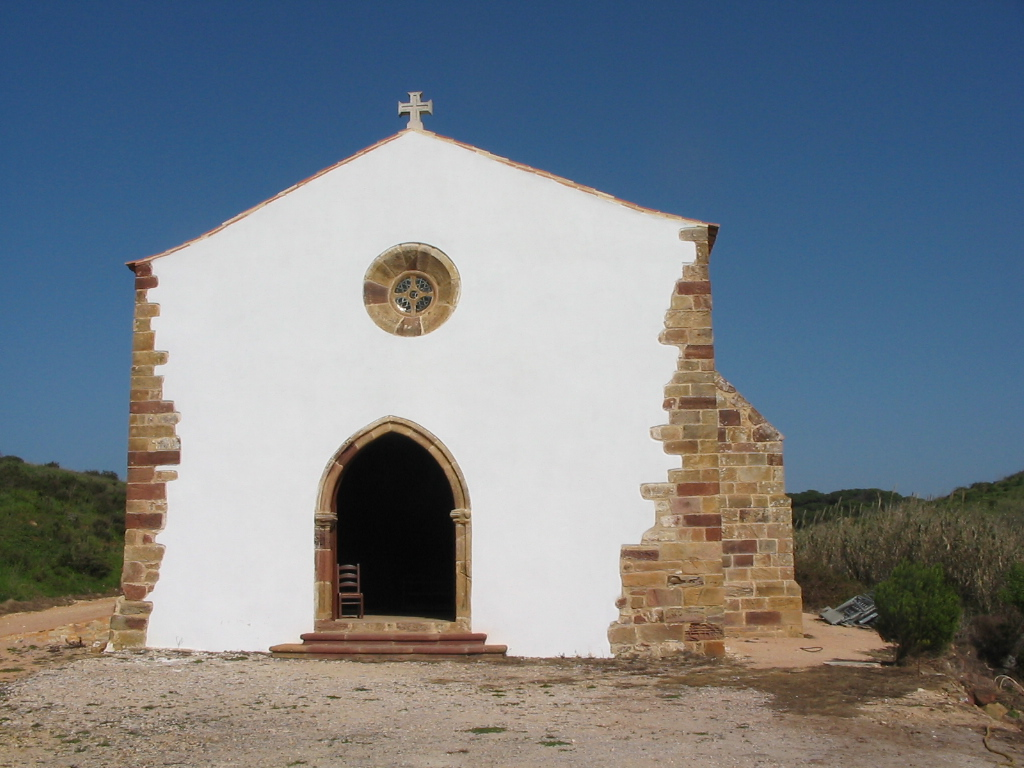
Hermitage of Our Lady of Guadalupe

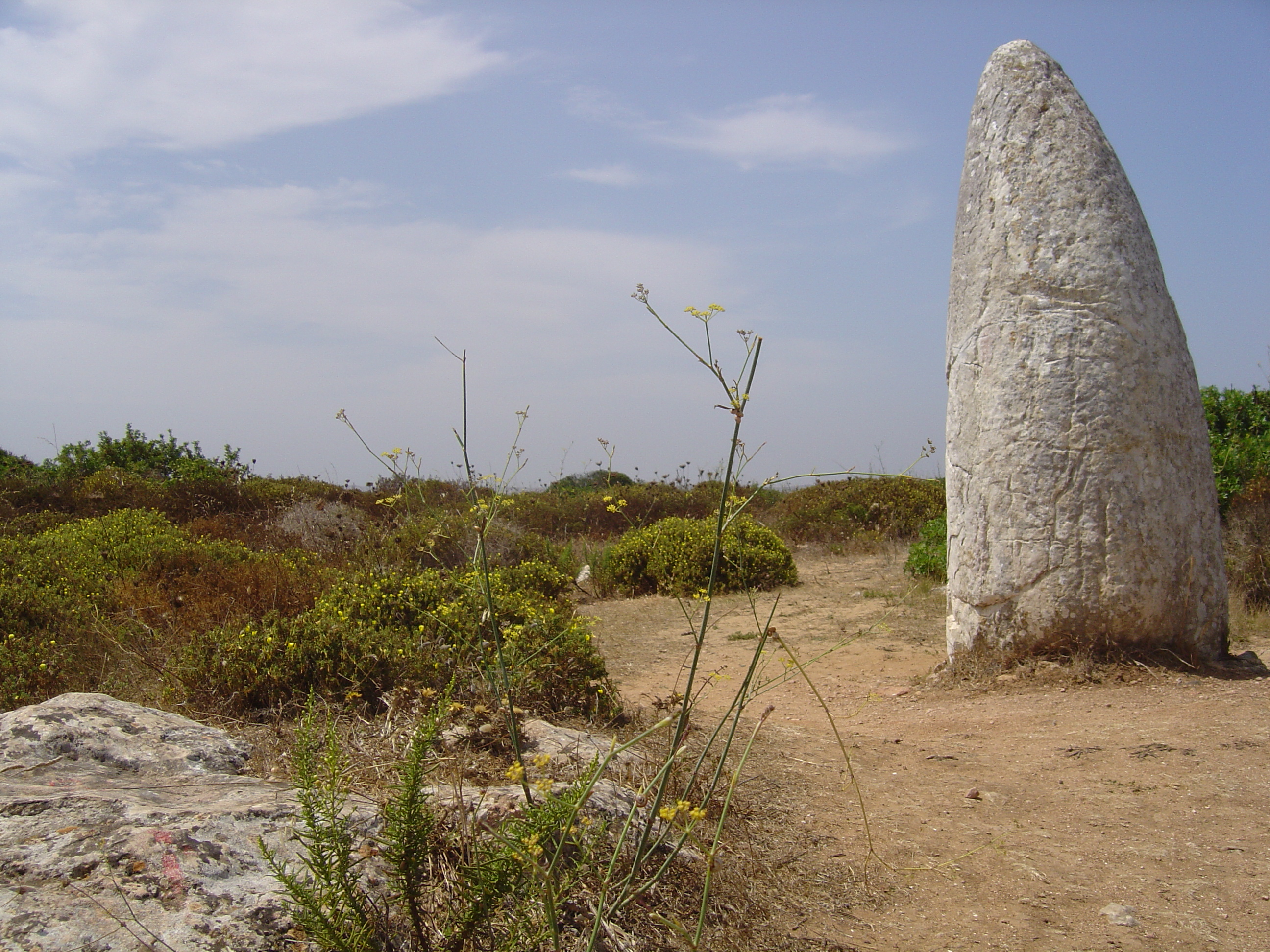
Menhir of Aspradantes

== Notable people ==
- Sousa Cintra, Portuguese businessman and former chairman of Sporting CP
