= Praia do Burgau =

Beach in Burgau, Portugal

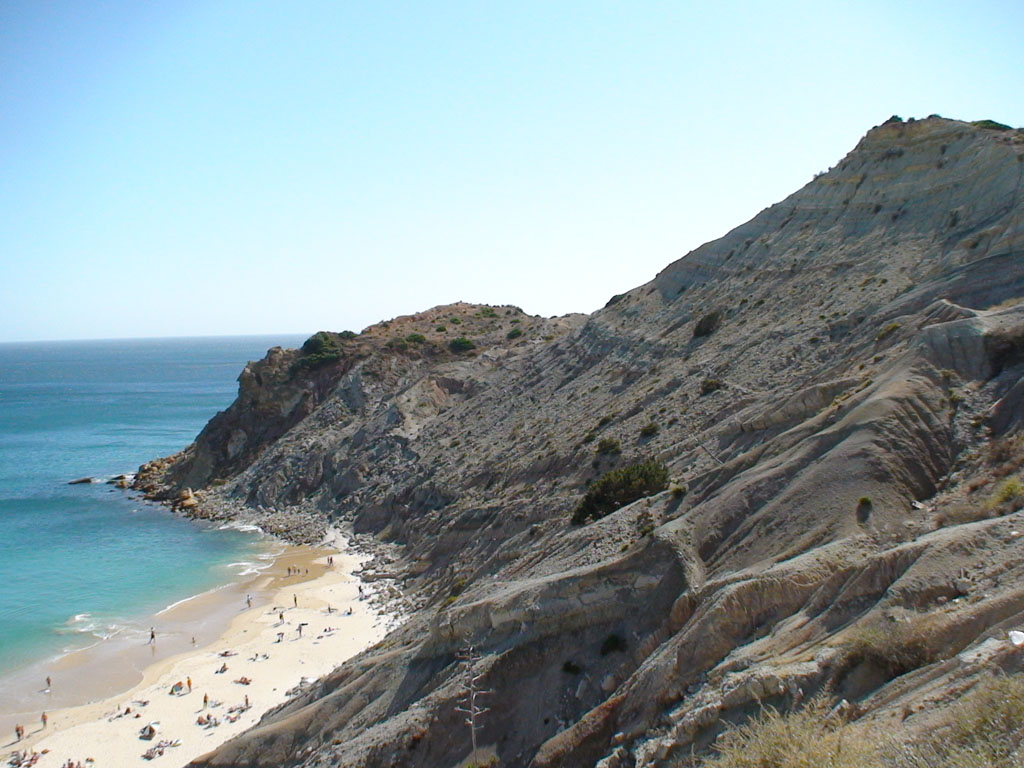
West side of the beach

Praia do Burgau, is a beach located in the small village of Burgau. As per other beaches located on the Algarve, the beach is afforded protection from the wind due to the high terrain enclosing it. As a former fishing town, two fishing companies with facilities near the beach are now closed; these have been replaced by a lifeguard station and a small docking area for boats. There are several small family owned bars and restaurant located in the vicinity. There is another small beach with no land access west to Praia do Burgau which can be accessed by boat or renting a canoe on the beach. It is a frequented place for people making scuba-diving and fishing.

The walking of dogs on this beach is strictly prohibited in peak-season, with a maximum fine of up to €2000 for those flouting the by-law. The beach has been awarded Blue Flag status.

== Gallery ==
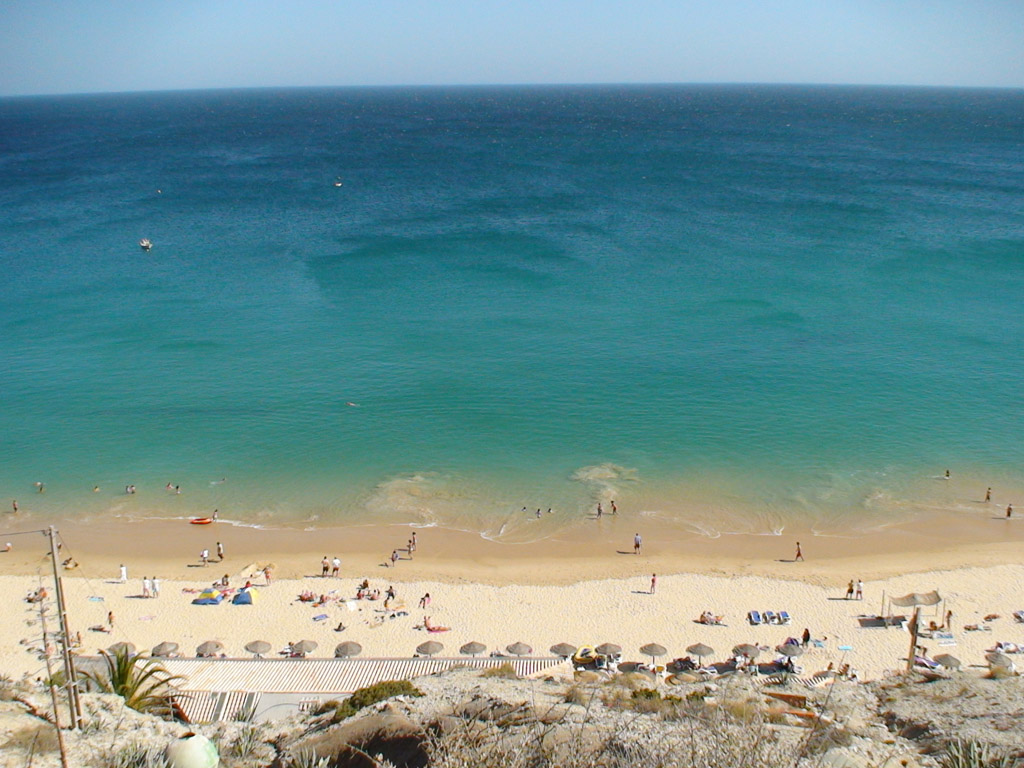

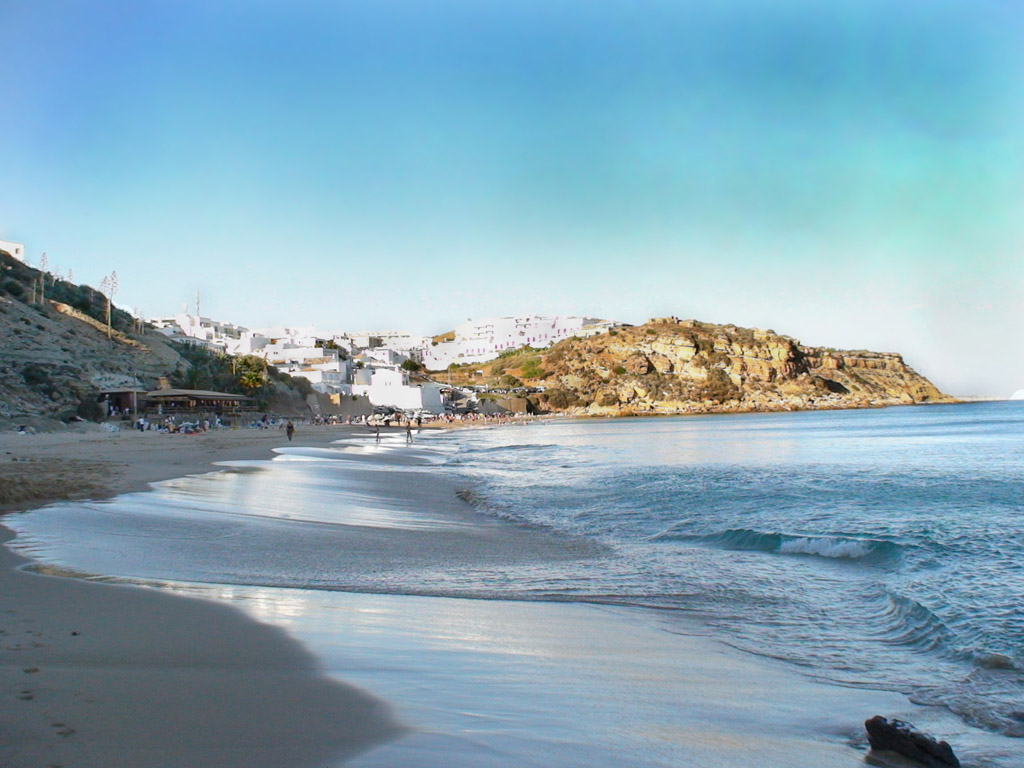

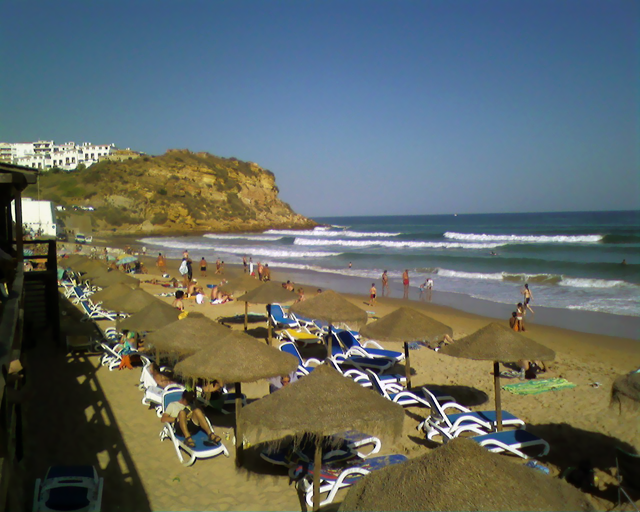

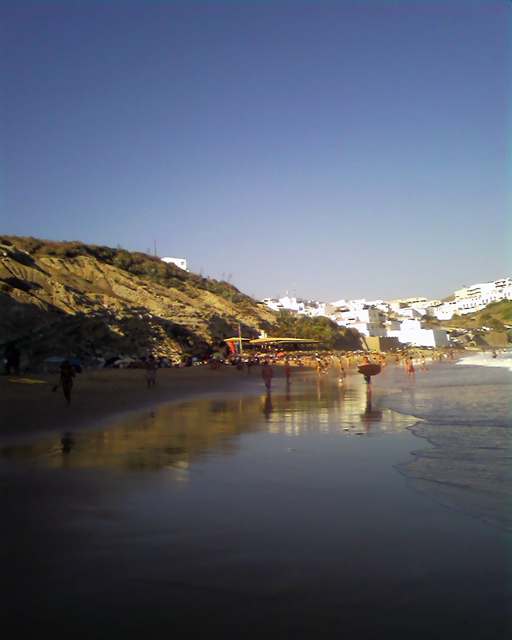

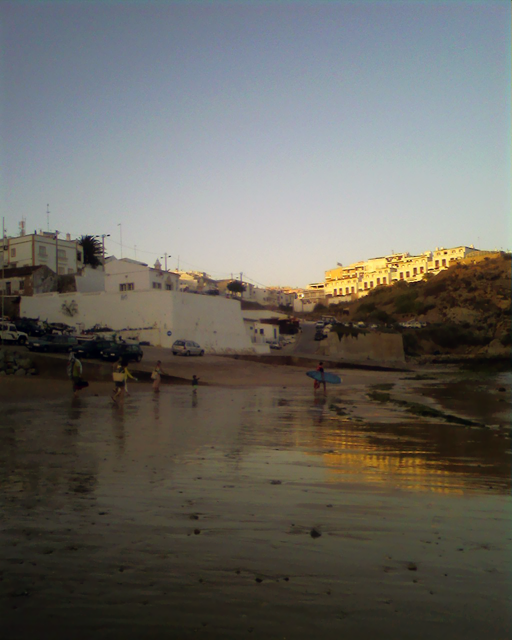
