= Vila do Bispo =

- Municipality
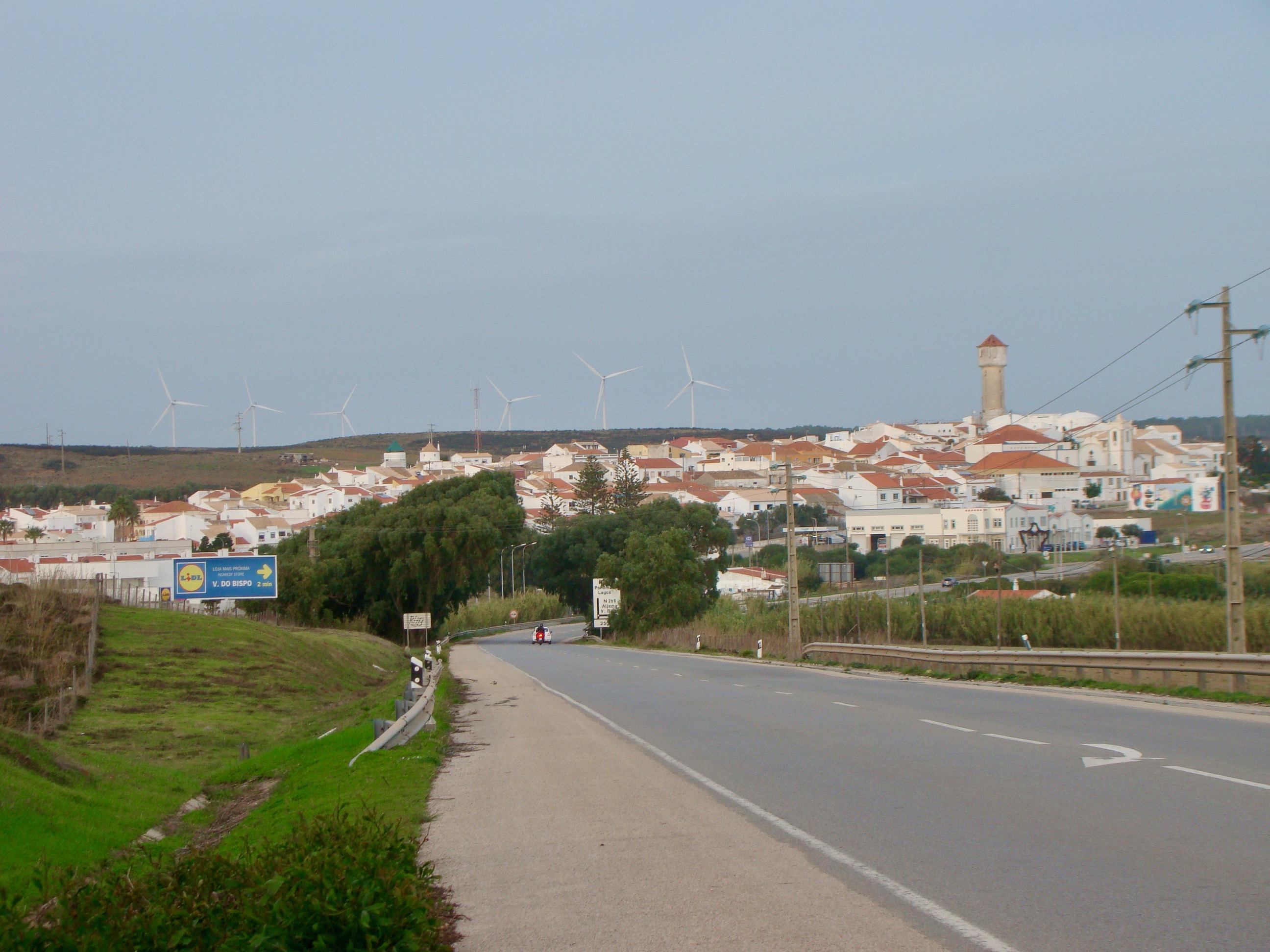
- Partial view of Vila do Bispo

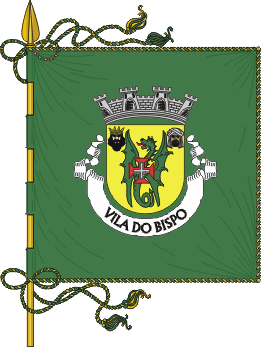
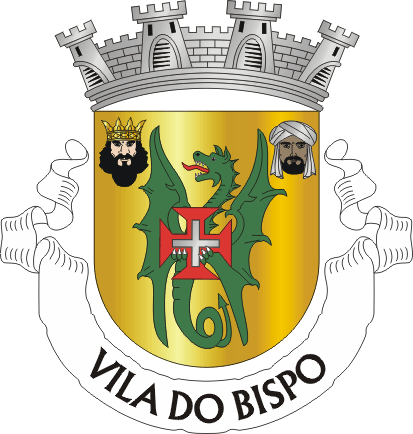
- Flag Coat of arms
- Interactive map of Vila do Bispo
- Coordinates: 37°04′57″N 8°54′43″W
- Country: Portugal
- Region: Algarve
- Intermunic. comm.: Algarve
- District: Faro
- Parishes: 4

Government
  - President: Adelino Soares

Area
  - Total: 179.06 km^{2} (69.14 sq mi)

Population (2021)
  - Total: 5,717
  - Density: 31.93/km^{2} (82.69/sq mi)
- Time zone: UTC+00:00 (WET)
  - Summer (DST): UTC+01:00 (WEST)
- Postal code: 8650
- Area code: 282
- Website: www.cm-viladobispo.pt

Vila do Bispo (European Portuguese pronunciation: [ˈvilɐ ðu ˈβiʃpu]) is a municipality (concelho) in the Portuguese Algarve. It has 5,717 inhabitants in an area of 179.06 km^{2}.

== History ==
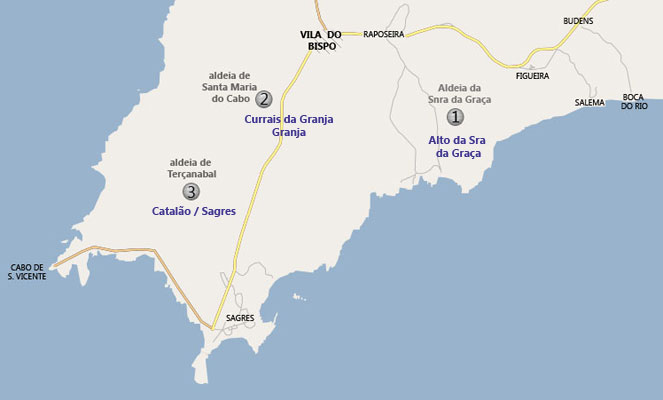
A map of the extinct settlements along the Cape Saint Vincent coast

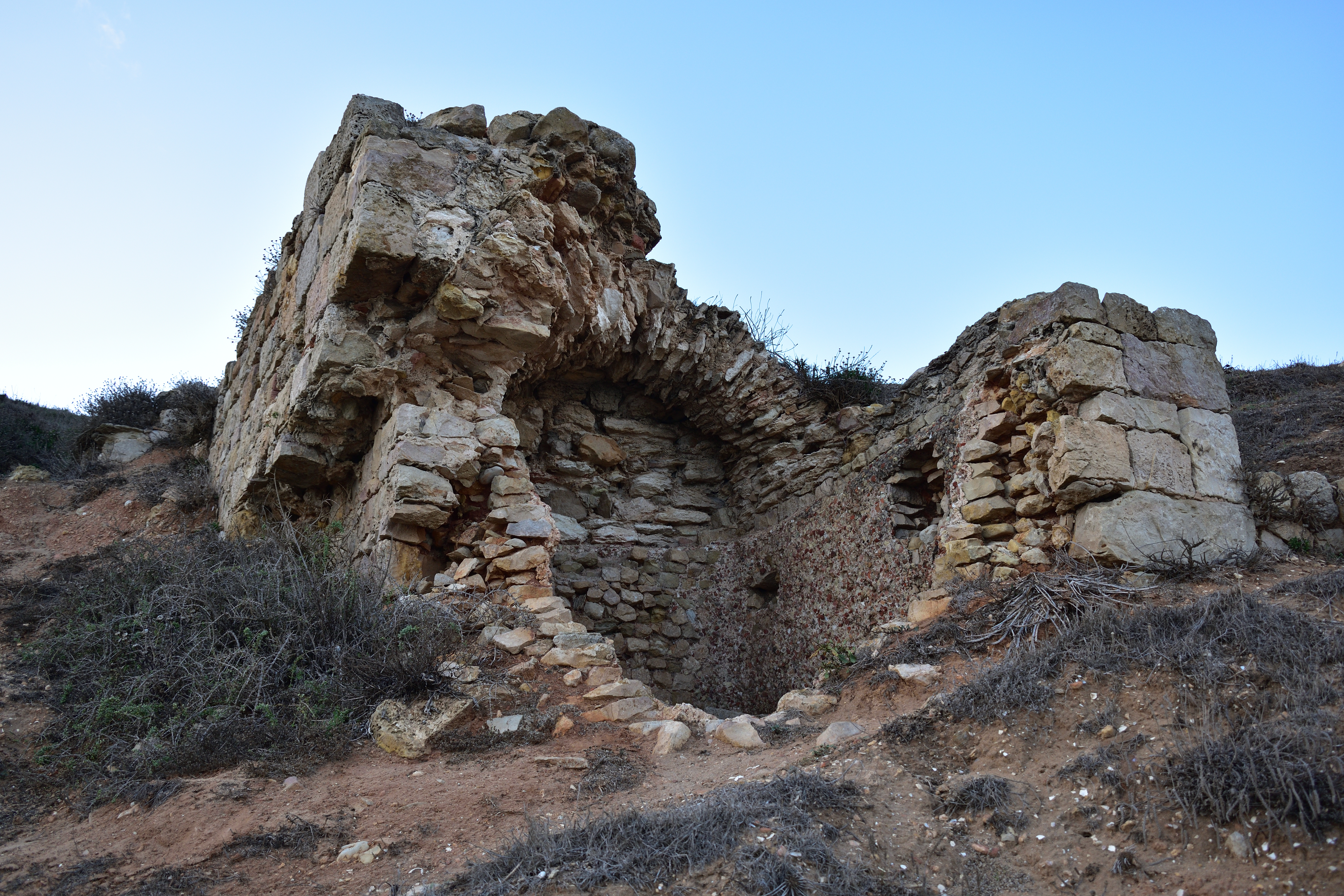
Roman ruins of Boca do Rio

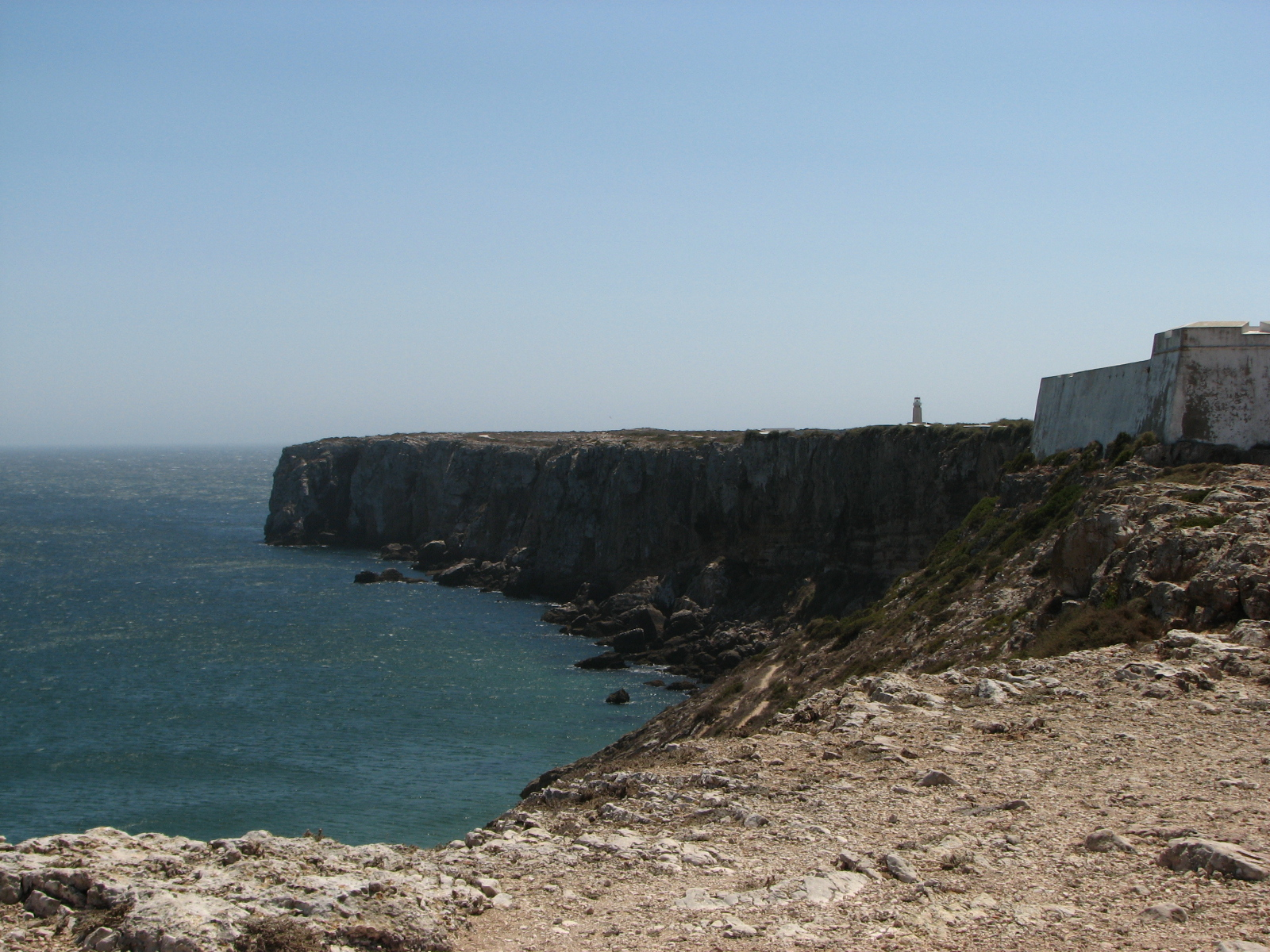
The End of the World, the edge of the Cape of Saint Vincent, showing a portion of the Fortress of Sagres

The first references to this region referred to the Aldeia do Bispo in the 14th century, in a charter dated 27 March 1329, and later, in 1353, a royal charter that promulgated the addition of the "locality that is called Bispo, which is in the Cape of Saint Vincent...", into the bishopric and domain/jurisdiction of Silves Municipality. This version of the circumstances would be contradicted throughout history. Lopes Silva (1841) indicated that the village of Bispo, later Vila do Bispo, arrived from the donation of the Aldeia de Santa Maria do Cabo by King Manuel to Bishop Fernando Coutinho. There is an assumption that this settlement, donated in 1515, became known as the Town of the Bishop, but the reality refers to several letters in 1329 and 1353, suggesting that the Aldeia do Bispo existed in the 14th century. In fact, Aldeia de Santa Maria do Cabo and Aldeia do Bispo were two distinct localities.

Another centre in Vila do Bispo was the locality of Nossa Senhora da Graça, which was mentioned in a royal charter issued by King Ferdinand, was situated south of the hermitage of Guadalupe, in the locality of Alto da Senhora da Graça, where the archaeological station of Veiga found vestiges of an extinct settlement, of Muslim origin, that were posterior the medieval Christian settlement. Near this area are toponymic references to Zavial and the strategic Alto da Senhora da Graça, where, in Ponta da Torre there exists remnants identifying the regions importance. It is assumed that during the Reconquista (around 1248) this area was a difficult battleground for the Christians, who likely invoked the "Virgin" for protection during their bloody battles. After their victory the settlement began to be referred to as the Aldeia da Graça (or Nossa Senhora da Graça) for the grace the obtained in the conquest of these lands. It is likely that the settlement was depopulated following the outbreak of the Black Death (around 1348), even as two-thirds of the population was infected.

Another important centre was founded on 19 September 1460 by Infante Henry the Navigator, where he wrote: "...I order the construction of a town at the other cape before the cape of Sagres, from the west...that I named town of the Infante". This interpretation has been controversial, owing to the particular reference to "before", which historians have difficulty in realizing. Friar Rosa Viterbo (1744/1822) in the Elucidário suggests that in the old Portuguese, it meant "forth, before or in the presence. It is very much used in the 13th century and following". Henry's words were that the town was situated "forth, before, in the presence" of the Cape of Sagres, in a place called "terça naball" (an old shed of Muslim origin), where he named it Vila do Infante. The Associação de Defesa do Património Histórico e Arqueológico de Vila do Bispo (Vila do Bispo Association for the Defense of Patrimony and Archaeology), which excavated and examined the region, the archaeological remnants of the last building near the Sagres coast is located in the area called Catalão in Sagres. Although these references match the documented proofs, there is still some discrepancy in assuming that the town was built so easily, even as the coast was an active front piracy and lacked potable water. It was a Portuguese, Fernão Mendes Pinto, who claimed to be the first European to set foot in Japan, reaching Tanegashima in 1543.

Aldeia do Bispo situated initially farther east of the current settlement, from the writings of Father Luís Cardoso, in the 18th century. The author mentioned that the parochial church existed outside the settlement, and the Aldeia de Santa Maria do Cabo (today extinct) was situated in the Curraes da Granja. Bishop Fernando Coutinho (master of Aldeia do Bispo) received the donation from King Manuel, of the Aldeia de Santa Maria do Cabo and integrated ito into the perimeter of Aldeia do Bispo. It was probably the privateer Francis Drake who was, later, responsible for the destruction of Aldeia de Santa Maria do Cabo.

Vila do Bispo has only been a municipality for a recent period. Separated from the municipality of Lagos, since the reign of King Afonso VI (around 1640), when it included the parishes of Barão de S. Miguel, Bordeira, Budens, Carrapateira, Raposeira, Vila do Bispo and Sagres (which was later carved from the municipality in 1519, and functioned as its own municipality until 1834).

Extinguished in 1855, the region was reintegrated into Lagos. But, six years later, as a consequence of Liberal reforms, it was reincorporated in September 1861, with many of the same parishes, except Bordeira and Carrapateira (which were abolished in 1849, integrated into the municipality of Aljezur in 1849). The municipality was, once again, abolished in August 1895, and reincorporated in January 1898.

In Sagres (which was a municipality until 1834) a coat-of-arms over the Fortress of Sagres was erected, ordered by the Viscount of Sá da Bandeira in 1839, then Minister of Marine Affairs (Ministro dos Negócios da Marinha). This coat-of-arms included the arms of Infante Henry the Navigator, an armillary sphere and a ship with sails, under a Latin and Portuguese inscription.

In honour of the first claimant to land in Japan, and owing to recognition of twinning with Nishinoomote on the island of Tanegashima, the main square in Vila do Bispo was renamed Praça de Tanegashima.

== Geography ==
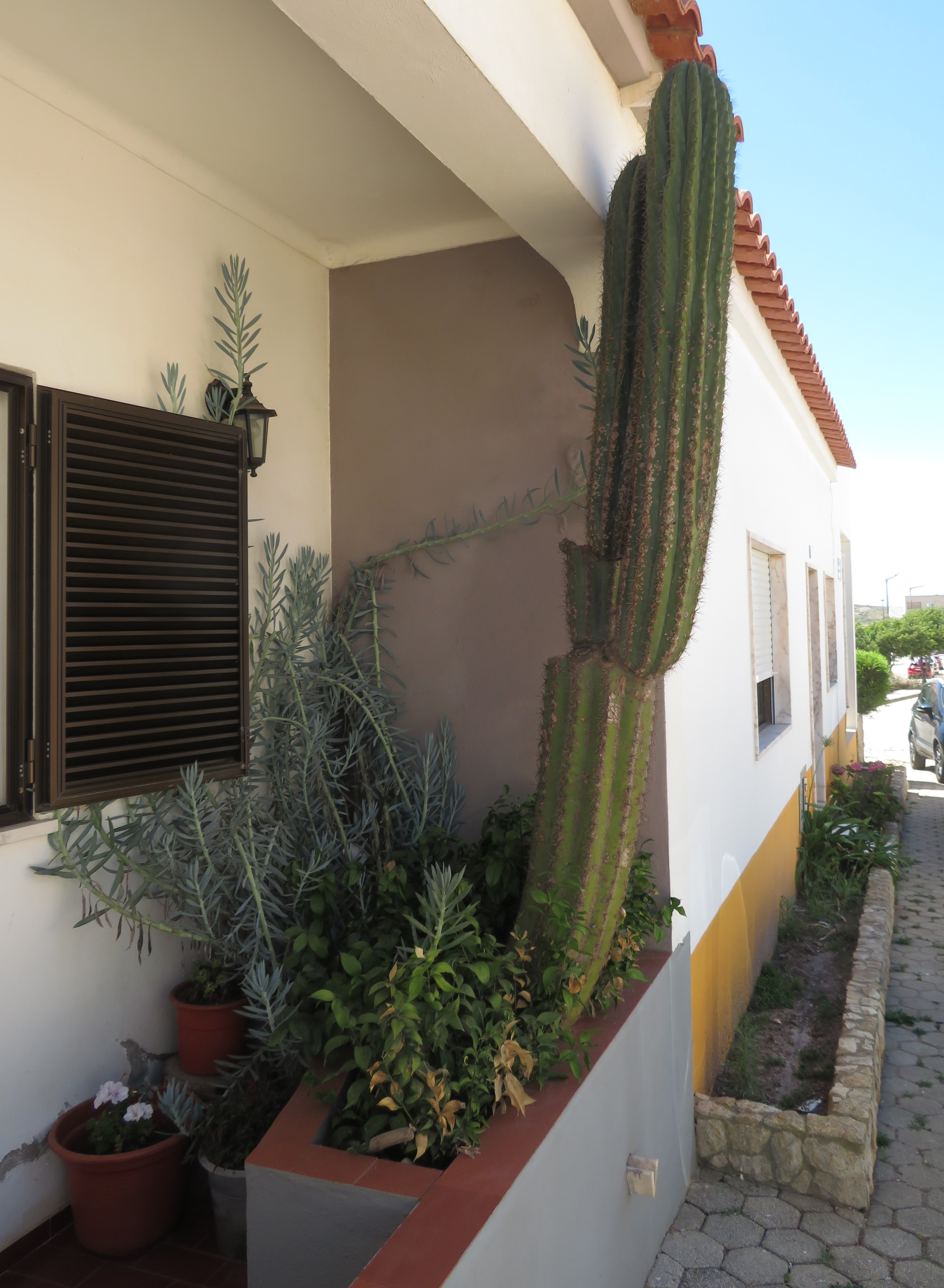
Cactus in Rua Dom Fernando Coutinho in the centre of Vila do Bispo

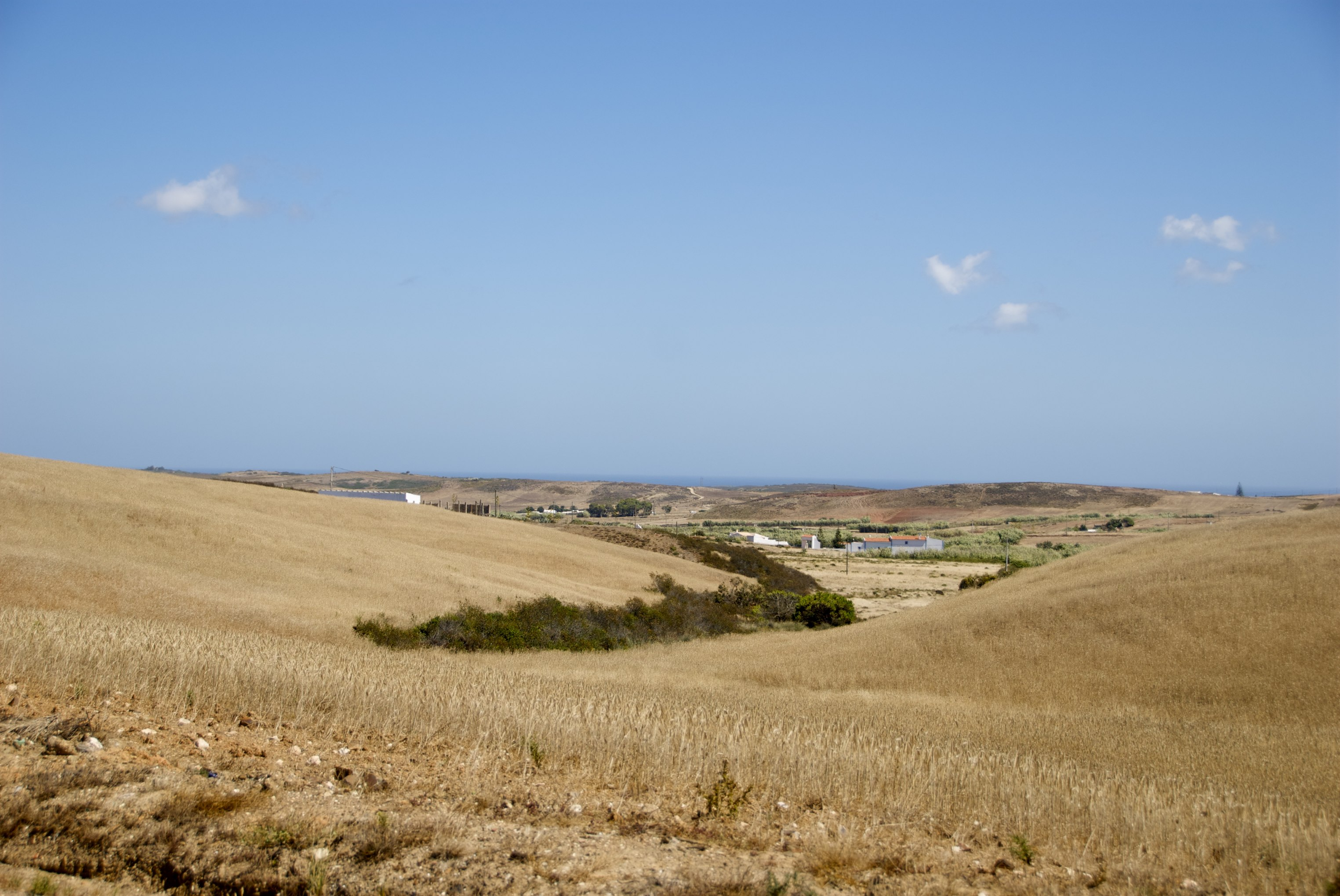
Large agricultural fields on the way to Vila do Bispo

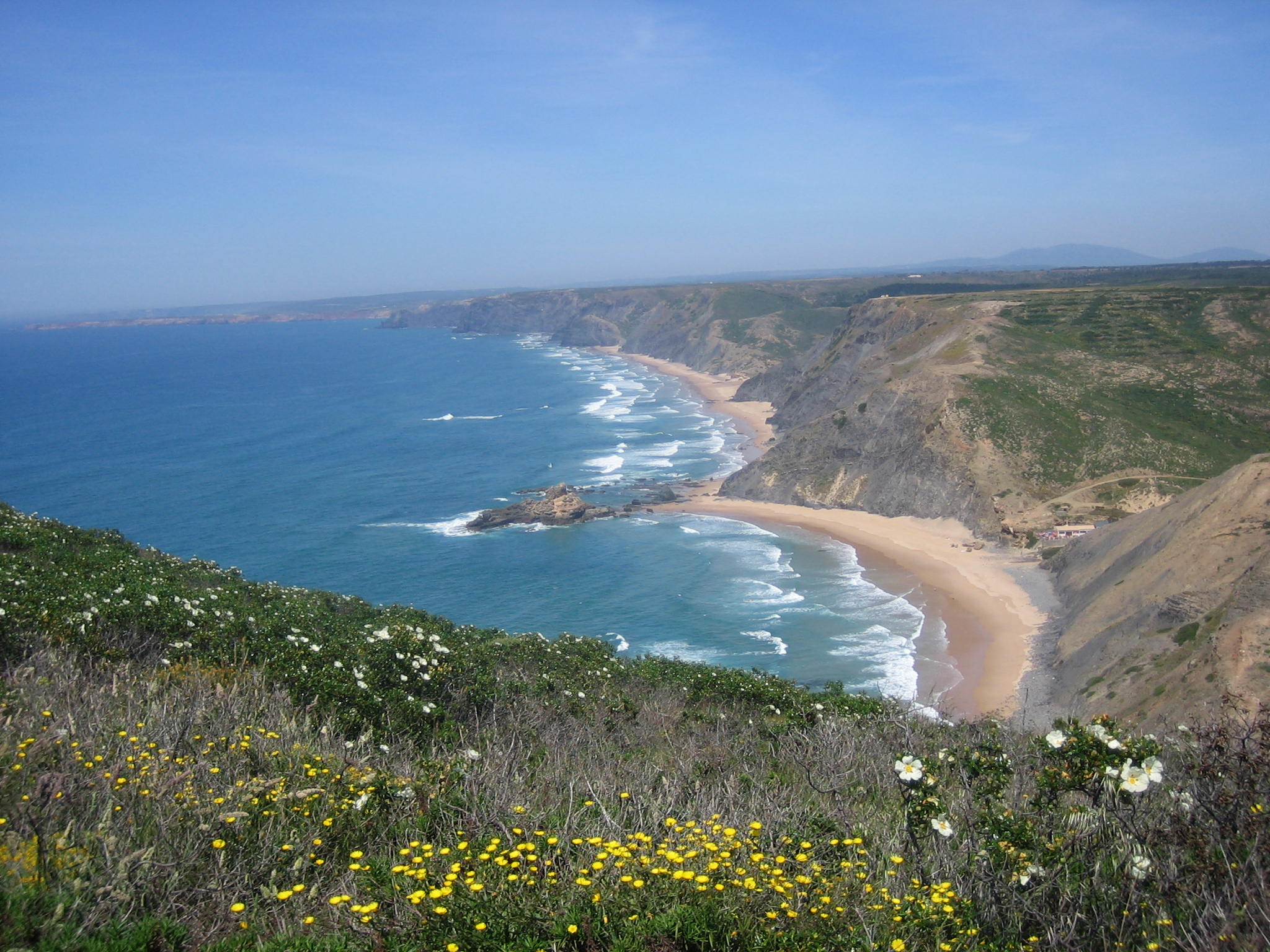
The beach of Castelejo, including the long expanse of sand and typical coastal shrubbery

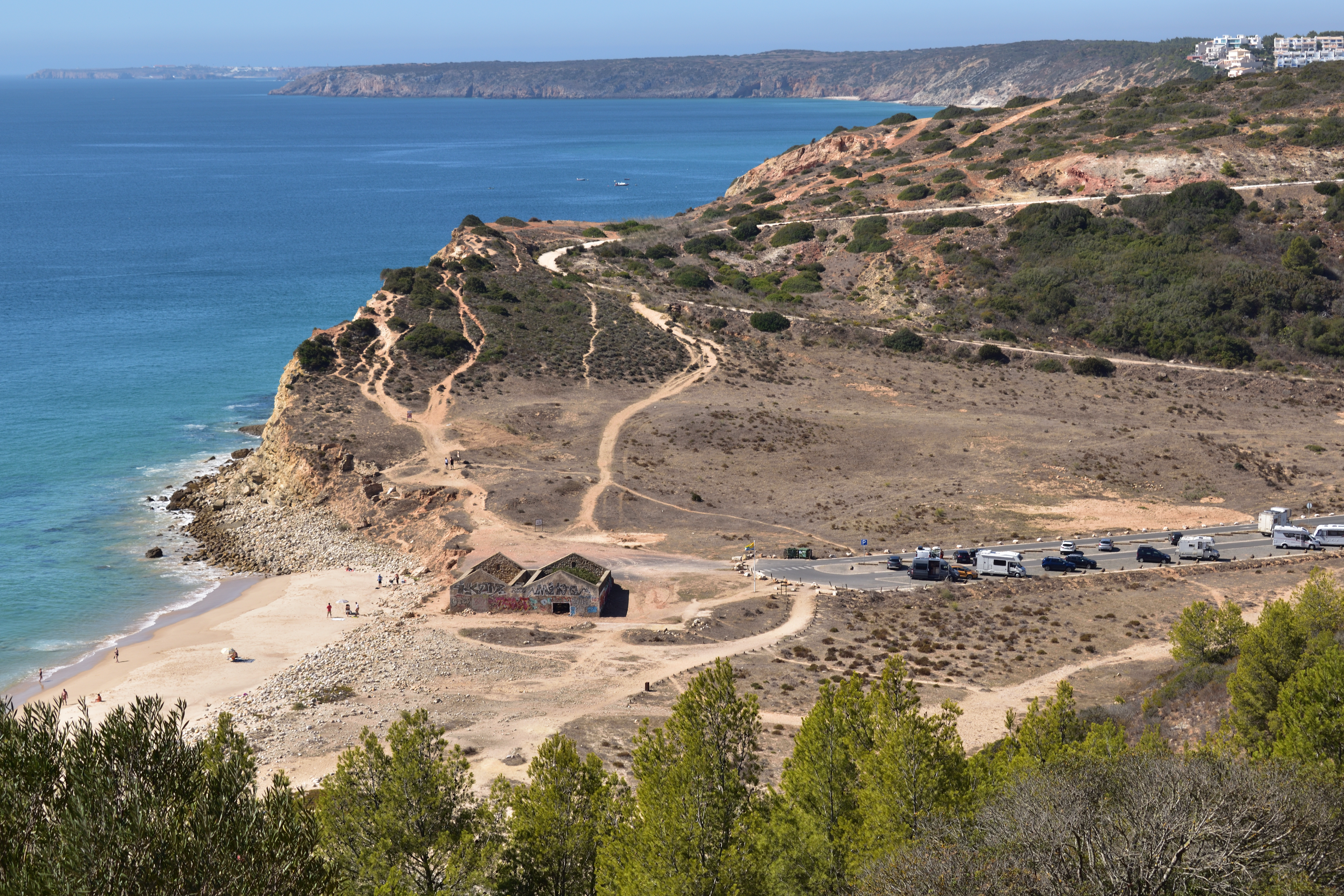
Boca do Rio Beach, Budens

Situated in the extreme southwest corner of Portugal (and also continental Europe), the municipality of Vila do Bispo is located within the Barlavento Algarvio, the southwestern Algarvean coast, surrounded on its southern and western frontiers by the Atlantic Ocean. Part of Faro District, the municipality is bordered in the north by Aljezur (linked by the Estrada Nacional EN120 and Estrada Regional ER268), and to the east by Lagos (across the Estrada Nacional EN125).

Due to its geographical location, it is the only municipality in the country with a western and southern coastline. The southern coast, which extends until Cape St. Vincent, includes several bays and sheltered coves, including: the beaches of Praia do Burgau, Cabanas Velhas, Boca do Rio, Praia da Salema, Figueira, Furnas, Zavial, Ingrina, Barranco, Martinhal, Mareta, Tonel and Beliche. Meanwhile, to the west of the St. Vincent coast are the beaches of Telheiro, Ponta Ruiva, Castelejo, Cordoama, Barriga and Murração, that include many carved cliffs and rocky promontories.

=== Climate ===
Vila do Bispo has a warm-summer Mediterranean climate (Köppen Csb) with warm to hot, dry summers and mild to very mild, wet winters. Vila do Bispo frequently experiences sunny conditions, averaging over 3100 hours of sunshine and, along with Faro, has the highest radiation in continental Portugal. Temperatures are often strongly moderated year-round by the onshore winds from the Atlantic Ocean and seldom are extremes of heat or cold experienced, consequence of the strong upwelling that the adjacent seas experience during the summer. Summers are often warm and very sunny, averaging a high of 25 °C (77 °F) and a low of 17–18 °C (63–64 °F). Winters are mild, especially at night with temperatures averaging 15–17 °C (59–63 °F) during the day and 9–11 °C (48–52 °F) at night. The parish has never registered a temperature above 40 °C (104 °F) or below 1 °C (34 °F). The municipality also has the lowest heating degree days (lowest demand for heaters) out of any populated place in Europe.

The wettest months of the year are November and December.

Climate data for Vila do Bispo, 1971-2000 normals and extremes, altitude: 115 m (377 ft)
Month	Jan	Feb	Mar	Apr	May	Jun	Jul	Aug	Sep	Oct	Nov	Dec	Year
Record high °C (°F)	20.7 (69.3)	23.4 (74.1)	25.6 (78.1)	27.4 (81.3)	29.4 (84.9)	35.2 (95.4)	39.2 (102.6)	35.4 (95.7)	35.4 (95.7)	29.1 (84.4)	27.4 (81.3)	24.7 (76.5)	39.2 (102.6)
Mean daily maximum °C (°F)	15.1 (59.2)	15.4 (59.7)	16.7 (62.1)	17.7 (63.9)	19.8 (67.6)	22.7 (72.9)	24.8 (76.6)	25.1 (77.2)	24.3 (75.7)	21.3 (70.3)	18.4 (65.1)	16.1 (61.0)	19.8 (67.6)
Daily mean °C (°F)	12.2 (54.0)	12.5 (54.5)	13.5 (56.3)	14.4 (57.9)	16.2 (61.2)	18.7 (65.7)	20.6 (69.1)	20.9 (69.6)	20.4 (68.7)	18.0 (64.4)	15.4 (59.7)	13.3 (55.9)	16.3 (61.4)
Mean daily minimum °C (°F)	9.3 (48.7)	9.7 (49.5)	10.2 (50.4)	11.2 (52.2)	12.6 (54.7)	14.8 (58.6)	16.4 (61.5)	16.7 (62.1)	16.6 (61.9)	14.7 (58.5)	12.3 (54.1)	10.6 (51.1)	12.9 (55.3)
Record low °C (°F)	1.7 (35.1)	1.4 (34.5)	3.7 (38.7)	5.6 (42.1)	6.6 (43.9)	10.1 (50.2)	10.4 (50.7)	9.4 (48.9)	9.2 (48.6)	7.7 (45.9)	4.6 (40.3)	2.9 (37.2)	1.4 (34.5)
Average rainfall mm (inches)	79.7 (3.14)	70.9 (2.79)	46.4 (1.83)	51.4 (2.02)	28.0 (1.10)	6.7 (0.26)	2.2 (0.09)	2.9 (0.11)	15.3 (0.60)	56.6 (2.23)	81.5 (3.21)	96.8 (3.81)	538.4 (21.19)
Average rainy days (≥ 0.1 mm)	10.4	10.0	6.9	7.6	5.6	1.9	0.5	0.4	2.1	6.1	8.6	11.4	71.5
Source: Instituto de Meteorologia

Climate data for Vila do Bispo, 1951-1980 normals and extremes, altitude: 115 m (377 ft)
Month	Jan	Feb	Mar	Apr	May	Jun	Jul	Aug	Sep	Oct	Nov	Dec	Year
Record high °C (°F)	21.6 (70.9)	21.2 (70.2)	24.8 (76.6)	27.2 (81.0)	32.1 (89.8)	33.1 (91.6)	37.0 (98.6)	35.9 (96.6)	36.2 (97.2)	31.9 (89.4)	27.4 (81.3)	24.7 (76.5)	37.0 (98.6)
Mean daily maximum °C (°F)	14.9 (58.8)	15.1 (59.2)	16.2 (61.2)	17.9 (64.2)	20.4 (68.7)	22.7 (72.9)	24.6 (76.3)	24.9 (76.8)	24.2 (75.6)	21.4 (70.5)	17.9 (64.2)	15.6 (60.1)	19.7 (67.4)
Daily mean °C (°F)	12.0 (53.6)	12.1 (53.8)	13.0 (55.4)	14.3 (57.7)	16.5 (61.7)	18.7 (65.7)	20.3 (68.5)	20.5 (68.9)	20.1 (68.2)	18.0 (64.4)	14.8 (58.6)	12.6 (54.7)	16.1 (60.9)
Mean daily minimum °C (°F)	9.1 (48.4)	9.1 (48.4)	9.8 (49.6)	10.7 (51.3)	12.6 (54.7)	14.7 (58.5)	16.0 (60.8)	16.1 (61.0)	16.0 (60.8)	14.6 (58.3)	11.7 (53.1)	9.6 (49.3)	12.5 (54.5)
Average rainfall mm (inches)	82.1 (3.23)	69.8 (2.75)	63.7 (2.51)	38.1 (1.50)	27.3 (1.07)	9.1 (0.36)	0.4 (0.02)	2.3 (0.09)	14.7 (0.58)	62.3 (2.45)	66.3 (2.61)	83.0 (3.27)	519.1 (20.44)
Source: Instituto de Meteorologia

Climate data for Sagres, normals 1981-2010, extremes 1973-present
Month	Jan	Feb	Mar	Apr	May	Jun	Jul	Aug	Sep	Oct	Nov	Dec	Year
Record high °C (°F)	23.2 (73.8)	26.0 (78.8)	27.8 (82.0)	27.9 (82.2)	35.1 (95.2)	35.5 (95.9)	37.5 (99.5)	40.4 (104.7)	34.3 (93.7)	30.4 (86.7)	27.0 (80.6)	26.0 (78.8)	40.4 (104.7)
Mean daily maximum °C (°F)	15.8 (60.4)	16.1 (61.0)	17.7 (63.9)	18.4 (65.1)	20.4 (68.7)	23.0 (73.4)	24.5 (76.1)	24.9 (76.8)	24.2 (75.6)	21.6 (70.9)	18.7 (65.7)	16.8 (62.2)	20.2 (68.4)
Daily mean °C (°F)	12.4 (54.3)	13.0 (55.4)	14.4 (57.9)	15.3 (59.5)	17.2 (63.0)	19.6 (67.3)	20.9 (69.6)	21.4 (70.5)	20.7 (69.3)	18.4 (65.1)	15.5 (59.9)	13.7 (56.7)	16.9 (62.4)
Mean daily minimum °C (°F)	9.0 (48.2)	9.8 (49.6)	11.1 (52.0)	12.1 (53.8)	13.9 (57.0)	16.2 (61.2)	17.3 (63.1)	17.7 (63.9)	17.1 (62.8)	15.1 (59.2)	12.1 (53.8)	10.5 (50.9)	13.5 (56.3)
Record low °C (°F)	−2.0 (28.4)	−1.4 (29.5)	0.8 (33.4)	4.0 (39.2)	6.0 (42.8)	8.0 (46.4)	8.0 (46.4)	9.0 (48.2)	5.0 (41.0)	5.8 (42.4)	1.8 (35.2)	0.7 (33.3)	−2.0 (28.4)
Average precipitation mm (inches)	53.1 (2.09)	59.0 (2.32)	44.6 (1.76)	42.0 (1.65)	19.7 (0.78)	7.6 (0.30)	1.6 (0.06)	2.2 (0.09)	21.0 (0.83)	51.9 (2.04)	95.3 (3.75)	93.3 (3.67)	494 (19.4)
Average precipitation days (≥ 1.0 mm)	7	6	5	6	4	1	1	1	2	7	8	10	58
Mean monthly sunshine hours	183.7	189.8	250.4	285.3	341.5	346.9	378.7	347.3	281.7	233.0	197.9	166.8	3,186.5
Source 1: Météo Climat 1981-2010 "Moyennes 1981/2010 Sagres". Baseline climate means (1981–2010) from stations all over the world. Météo Climat.
Source 2: Météo Climat 1973-present "Extremes for Sagres". Météo Climat.

=== Human geography ===
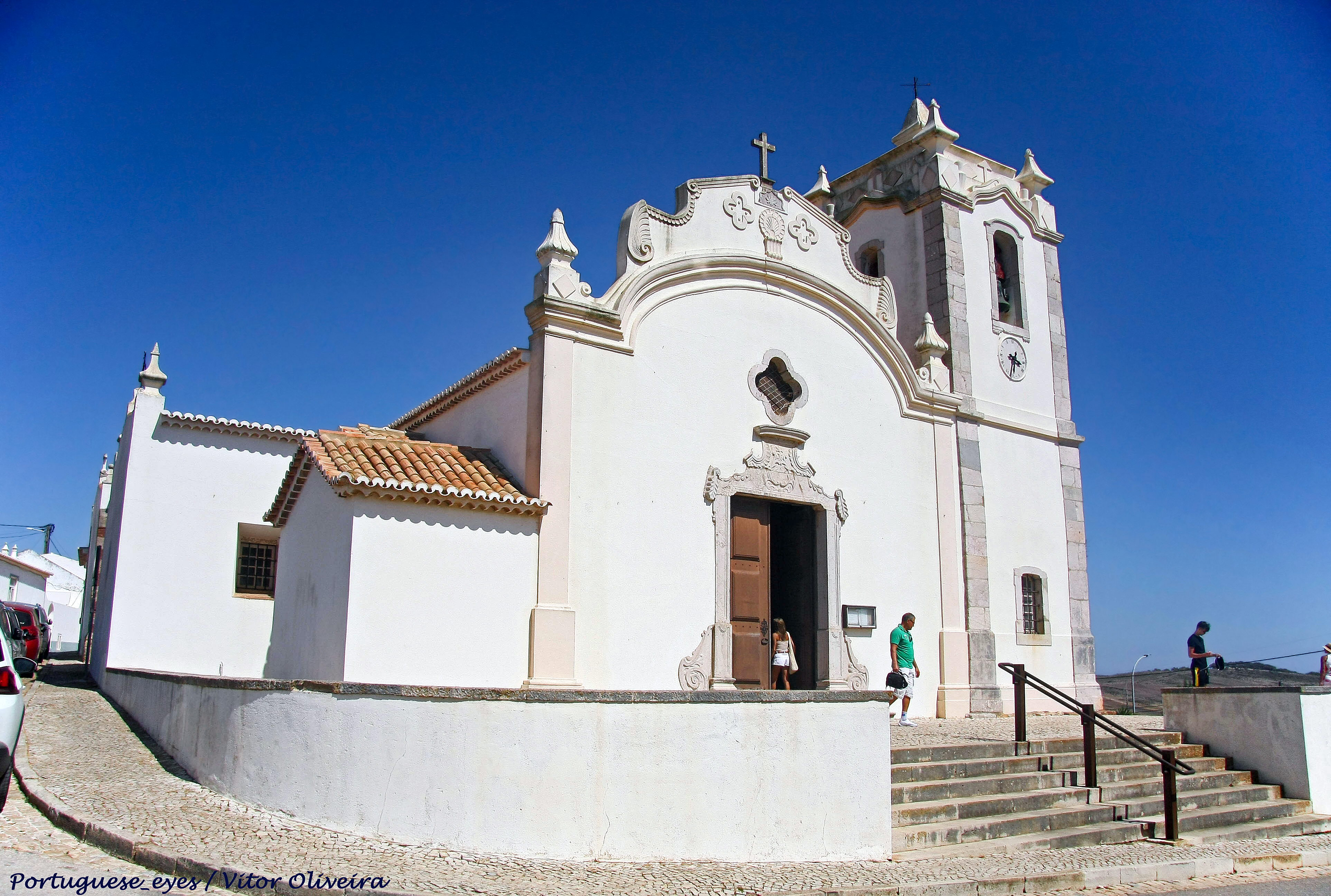
Vila do Bispo, parish church

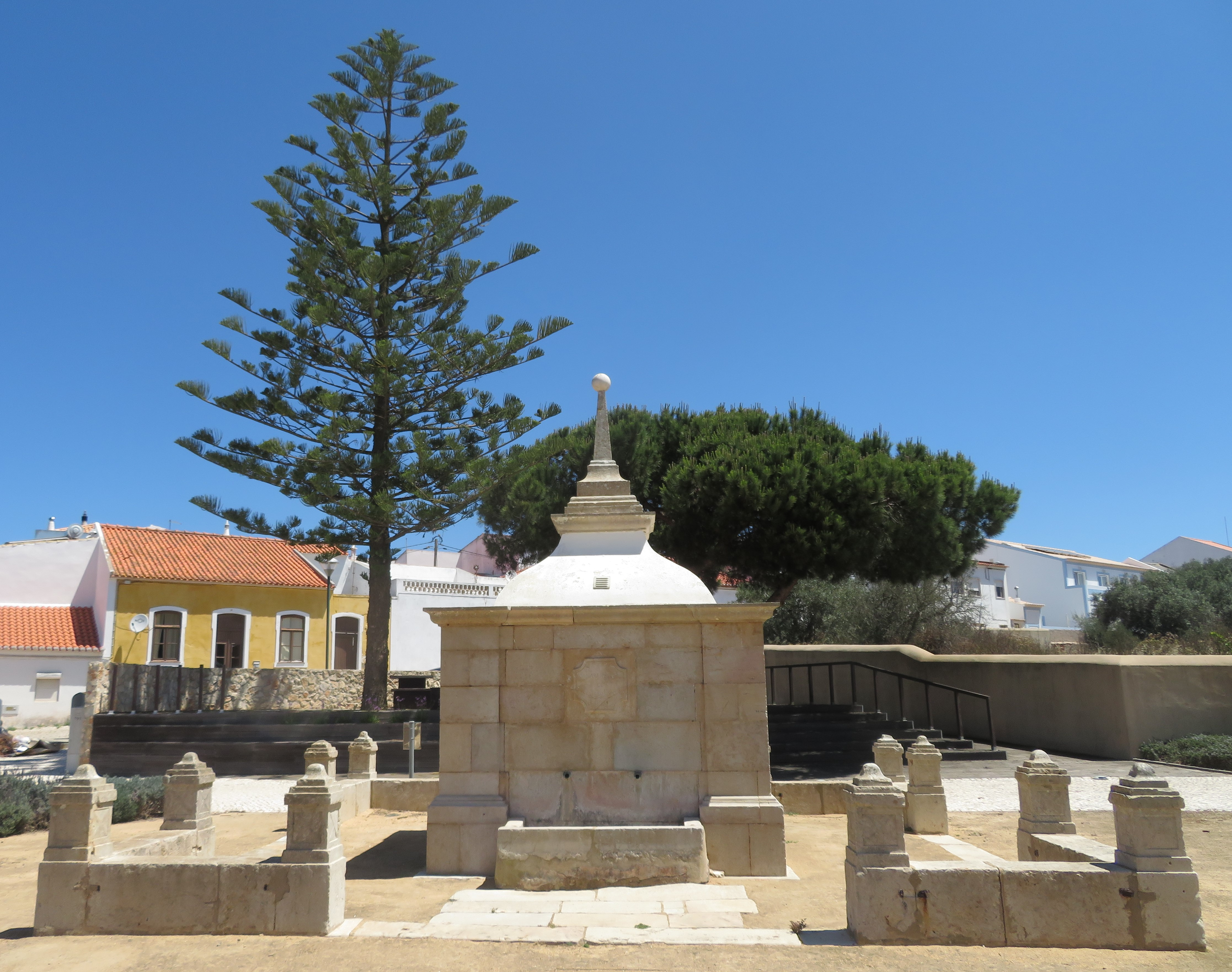
Historical fountain in the centre of Vila do Bispo

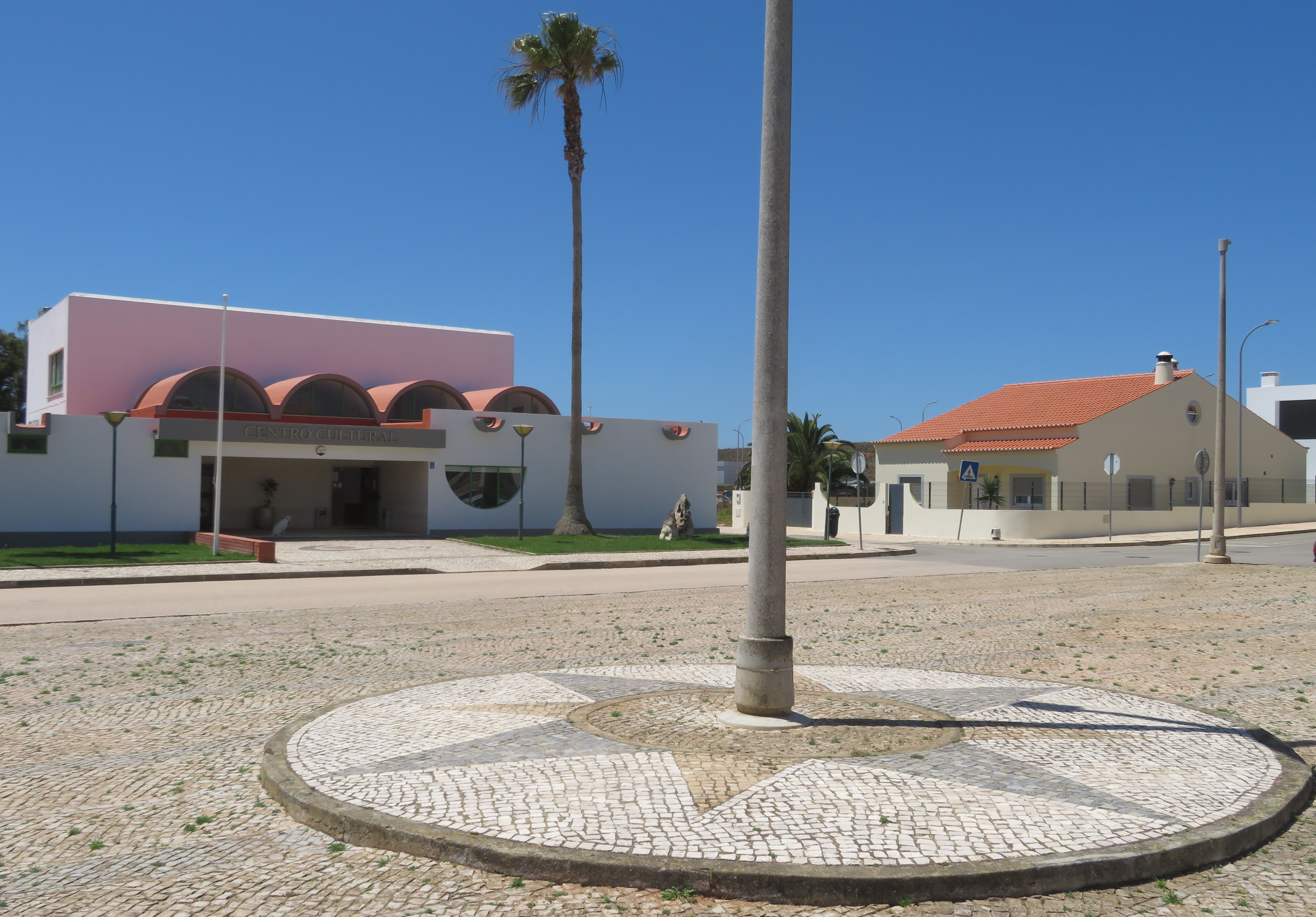
Cultural Centre in the centre of Vila do Bispo

Population of Vila do Bispo (1801 - 2004)
Year	Pop.	±%
1801	684	—
1849	3,278	+379.2%
1900	4,912	+49.8%
1930	6,082	+23.8%
1960	5,988	−1.5%
1981	5,700	−4.8%
1991	5,762	+1.1%
2001	5,349	−7.2%
2011	5,258	−1.7%

Administratively, the municipality is divided into 4 civil parishes (freguesias):

- Barão de São Miguel
- Budens
- Sagres
- Vila do Bispo e Raposeira

In addition, there are several urban agglomerations (villages) that dot the landscape of the municipality in addition to the urban seats of the civil parishes, including:

- Burgau
- Salema
- Vale de Boi
- Budens

== Menhirs ==
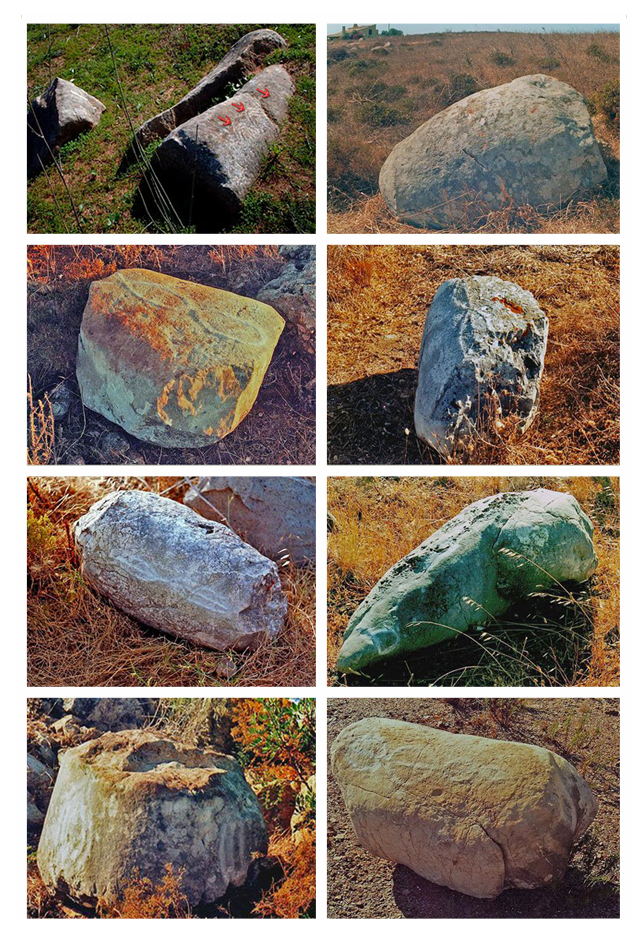
Vila do Bispo Menhirs, some decorations

The municipality of Vila do Bispo has the most important concentration of menhirs in the entire Algarve, with a known number of around 300 examples. They are mostly made of white limestone, whose brightness makes them an element that stands out in the landscape, and three examples in sandstone are also known in the municipality. With sub-cylindrical, sub-conical, stellar or simple erect stones, the vast majority of menhirs are decorated. They include the Menhirs of Padrão, the Menhirs of Milrei and the Menhir of Aspradantes.

The most common decorations in the menhirs of the municipality of Vila do Bispo are:

- sets of 3 or 4 parallel wavy lines;
- sets of segmented ellipses;
- sets of non-segmented ellipses that extend from the top of the menhir to the base;
- sets of semi-ellipses that organize around a cord at the top of the menhir (see photo). Its meaning is unknown

Despite the protection formally guaranteed by official entities for some menhirs, in practice the menhirs of Vila do Bispo remain exposed, on a daily basis, to a whole vandalism that mainly translates into their use for civil construction.

== Twin towns — sister cities ==
Vila do Bispo is twinned with:

- Baiona, Spain
- Cape Canaveral, United States
- Nishinoomote, Japan
- Santa Fe, Spain

== Economy ==
Close to the municipality of Lagos, starting from the small town of Burgau it belongs to a protected area that covers most of the westernmost part of Algarve (Barlavento Algarvio), so its beaches are famous for their perceived beauty. Owing to its natural conditions, this area of Algarve has been transformed into a tourist-oriented economy, with retirees and seniors buying or renting homes or condominimums along the coastal zones, including Parque da Floresta and Alma Verde.

== Notable citizens ==
- César Ferreira (1916 – ??) a footballer who played for Benfica as midfielder
- Sousa Cintra (born 1944 in Raposeira) businessman, former chairman of Sporting Clube de Portugal
- Iládio Amado (born 1976) a teacher of music education, an instrumentalist and a composer. He lives in Vila do Bispo
