= Fort of Santo António de Belixe =

Fort in Portugal

- Faro District; Near Sagres in Portugal
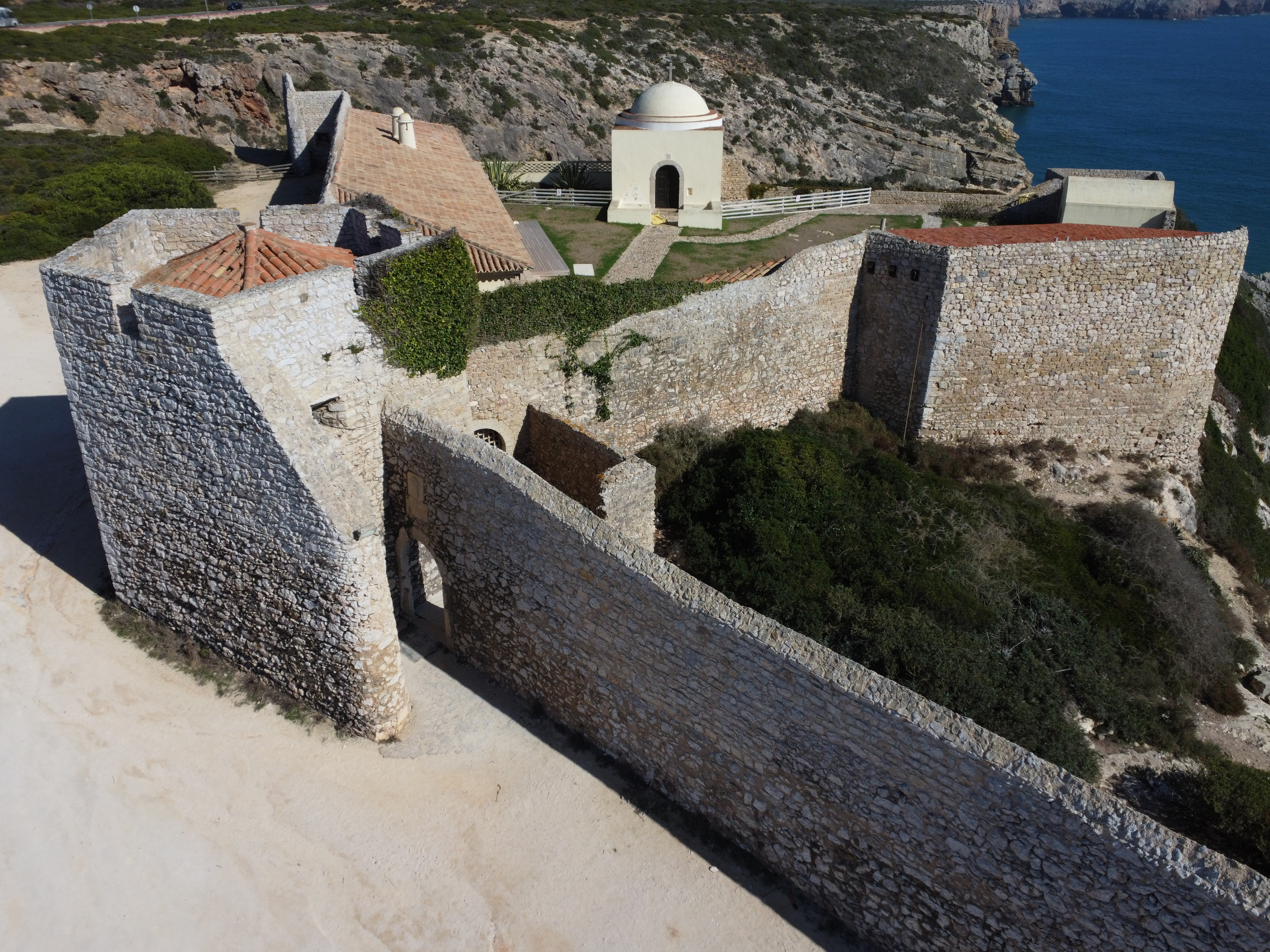
- Aerial view of the Beliche fort

Site information
- Type: Fort
- Open to the public: ??
- Condition: Restored but subject to coastal erosion

Location
- Coordinates: 37°01′38″N 8°58′56″W

Site history
- Events: Bombardment by Francis Drake in 1578

The Fort of Santo António de Belixe (Fort of Saint Anthony of Beliche), which is also referred to as the Fortress of Beliche (Portuguese: Fortaleza de Belixe), is located on Cape St. Vincent in the parish of Sagres, municipality of Vila do Bispo, Faro District, in Portugal. The original date of construction is unknown but the fort was already in existence in the 16th century.

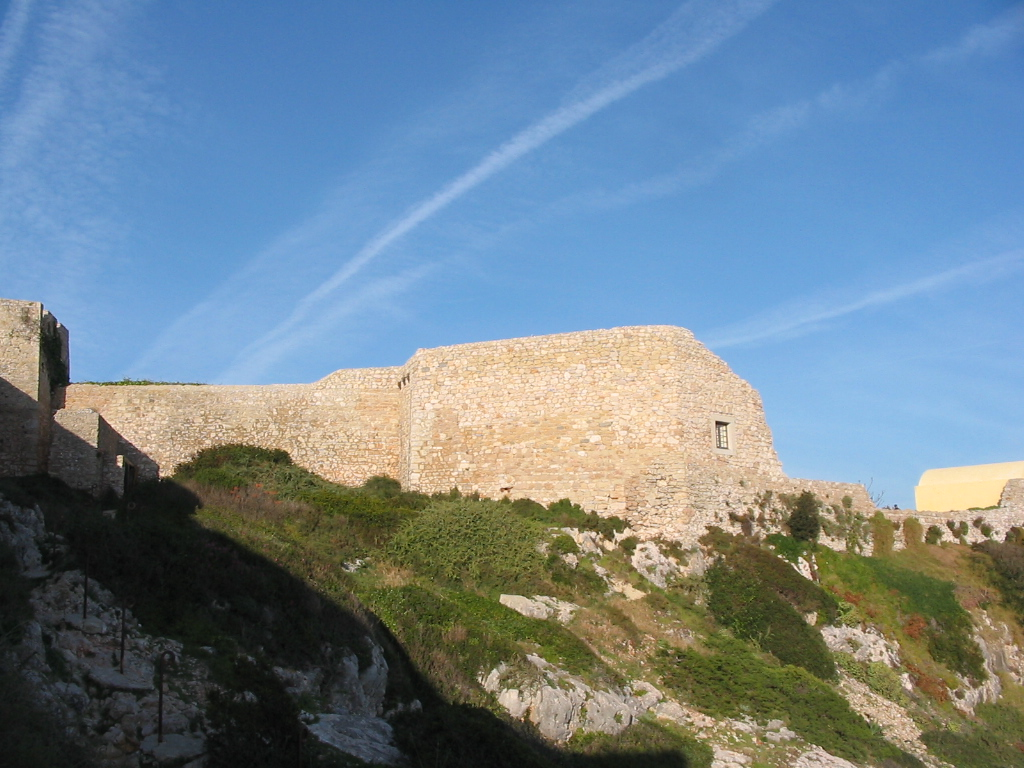
View of the frotress from the cliffs

== History ==
Situated on the top of the cliff that, at an altitude of 86 metres, dominates the Bay of Beliche (or Belixe), the fort certainly already existed in the 16th century as it contains the coat of arms of King Sebastian (1554–1578). Because of its strategic position at the southwest tip of Portugal it has been assumed that the site had been used for military purposes since ancient times, although there is no archaeological evidence to that effect. One theory is that the fort was built by order of King Manuel I (1469–1521), who lived at the nearby Cape St. Vincent at the beginning of the 16th century. The fortress follows a structure common to the military architecture of the time, with a star-shaped polygonal plan, with batteries facing the sea. A long staircase gives access to the beach. Within the grounds of the fort is a small chapel, which was originally dedicated to Saint Catherine but is now dedicated to Saint Anthony.

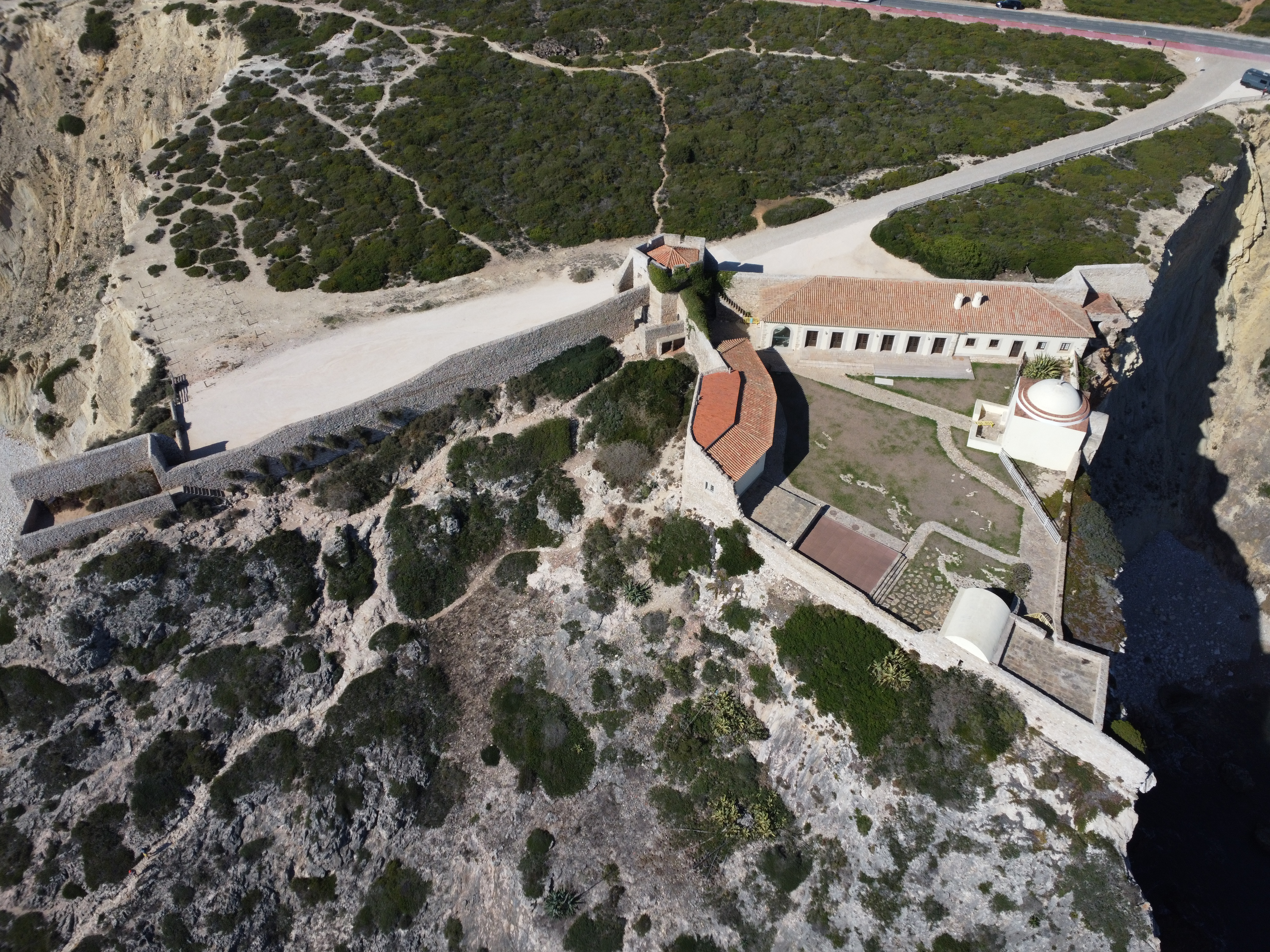
Aerial photograph of the fortress.

In 1578, the English sea captain Francis Drake, regarded as a privateer by the Portuguese, attacked the fort and caused serious damage, leading to significant reconstruction work under the instructions of Philip III of Portugal, which was not completed until 1632. This remains the basis of the existing structure, despite it having been significantly damaged by the 1755 earthquake.

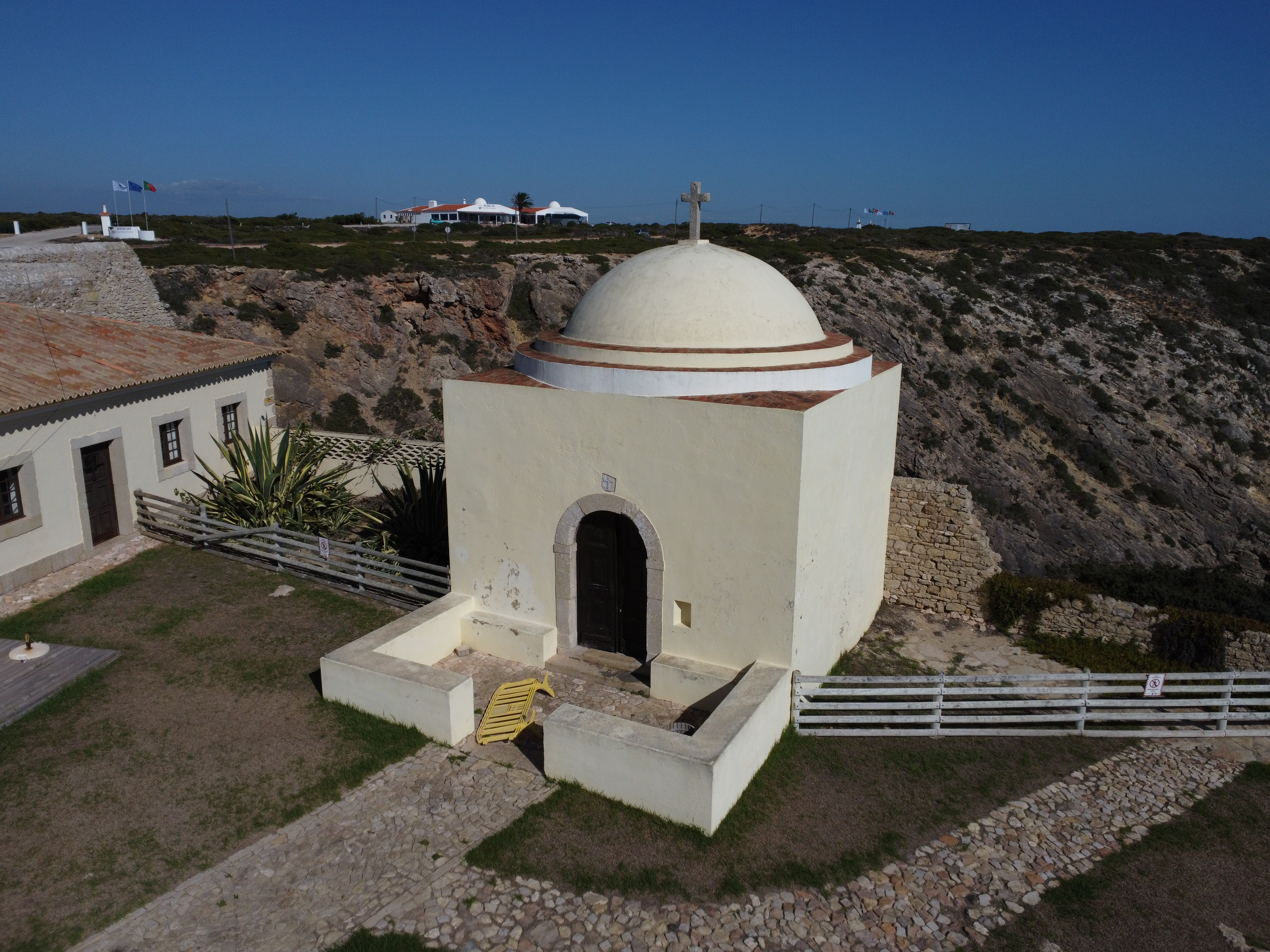
View of the chapel.

Around 1960 the fort was adapted to be used as a tourist facility. At that time, important areas of the interior were also remodeled and some sections were rebuilt. Although well-integrated into the fort this new feature could do nothing to prevent the continued erosion of the cliff on which the fortress stands. For safety reasons the facility closed in the 1990s. Work to address the erosion problem is ongoing, with the involvement of the Faculty of Science and Technology of the University of Algarve. Of particular concern is the Chapel. At the end of 1997 the Baroque altarpiece was transferred to the Church of Nossa Senhora da Graça, in the nearby Fortress of Sagres.

Ownership of the fort passed to the municipality of Vila do Bispo in 2012, for the sum of just €4000.
