= Sagres (Vila do Bispo) =

- Civil parish
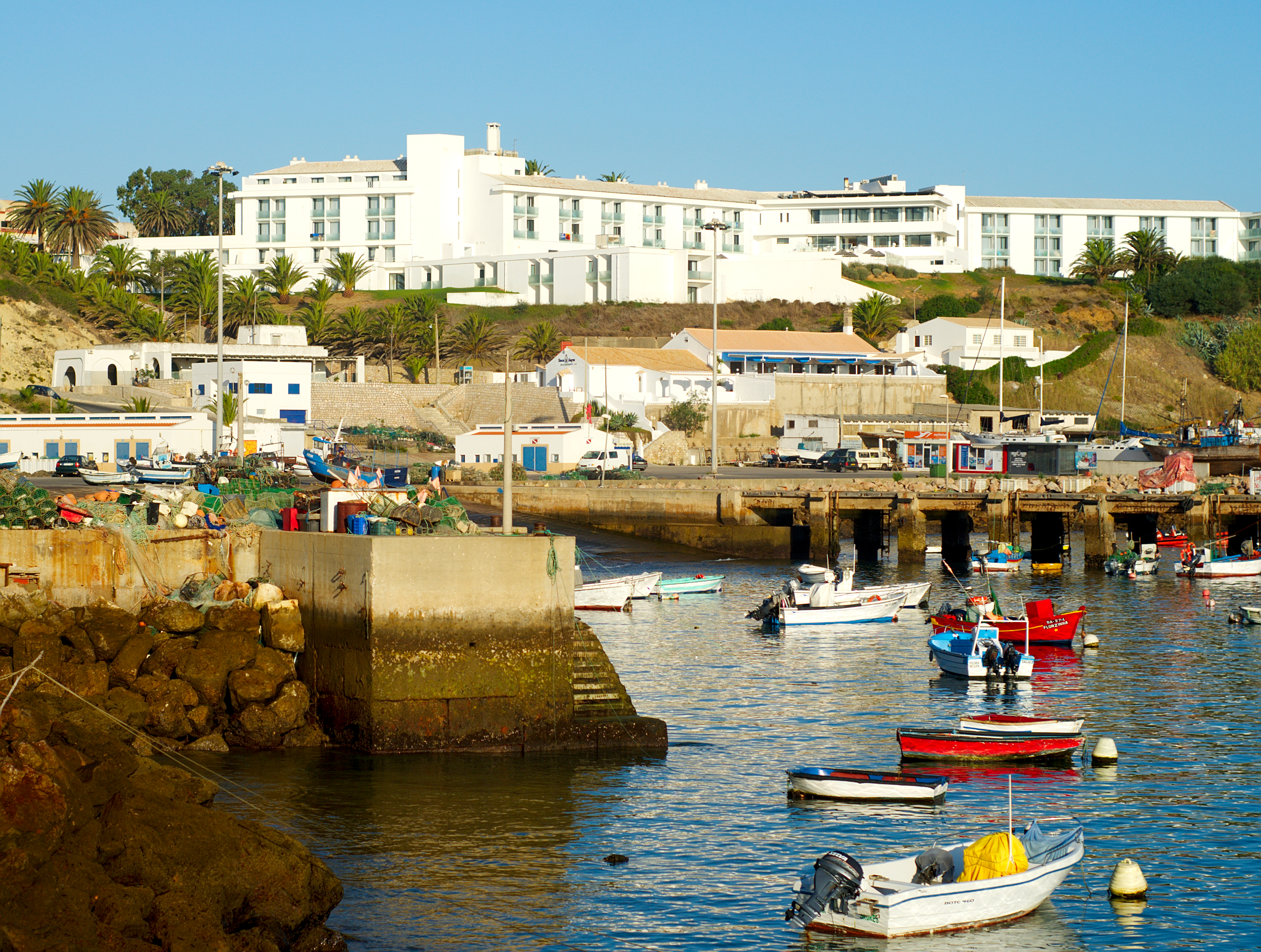

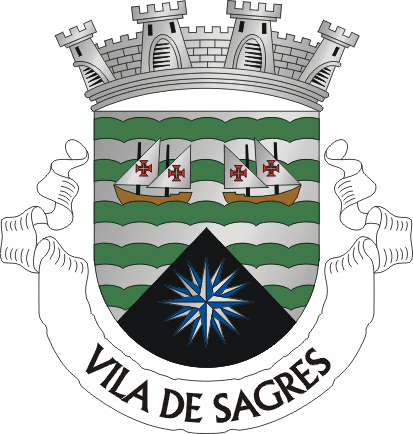
- Coat of arms

- Location in Portugal
- Coordinates: 37.010°N 8.939°W
- Country: Portugal
- Region: Algarve
- Intermunic. comm.: Algarve
- District: Faro
- Municipality: Vila do Bispo

Area
  - Total: 34.37 km^{2} (13.27 sq mi)

Population (2021)
  - Total: 1,894 ▼
  - Density: 55.11/km^{2} (142.7/sq mi)
- Time zone: UTC+00:00 (WET)
  - Summer (DST): UTC+01:00 (WEST)
- Postal code: 8650
- Area code: 282
- Website: www.jf-sagres.pt

Sagres is a civil parish in the municipality of Vila do Bispo, in the southern Algarve of Portugal. It has 1,894 inhabitants (2021) in an area of 34.37 square kilometres (13.27 sq mi). It is historically connected to the early Portuguese Age of Discovery.

Sagres is near the Western end of the world's longest estimated straight-line path over land, at 11,241 km, ending near Jinjiang in the People's Republic of China.

== History ==
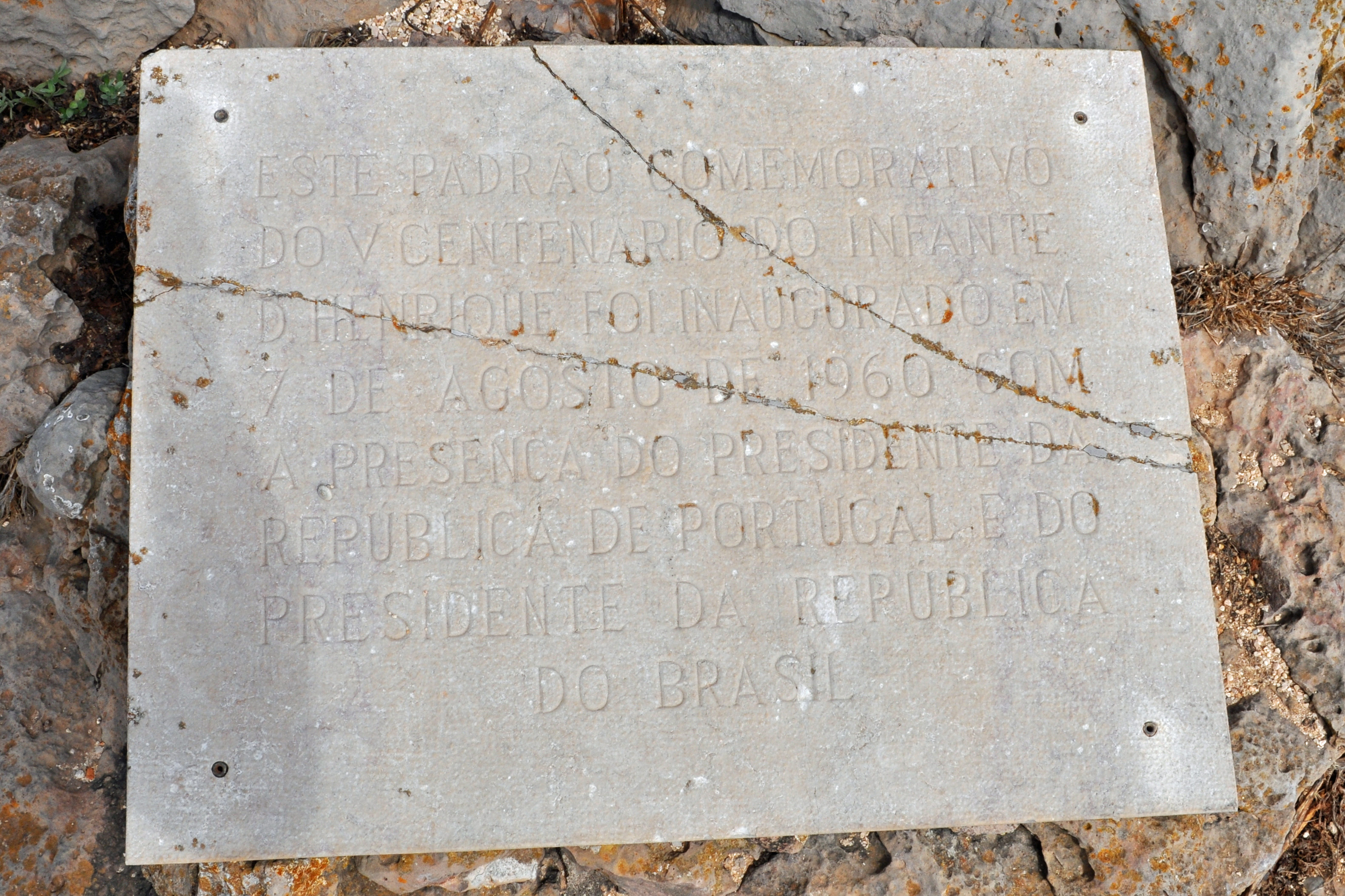
A commemorative plaque marking the 15th century of Henry the Navigator

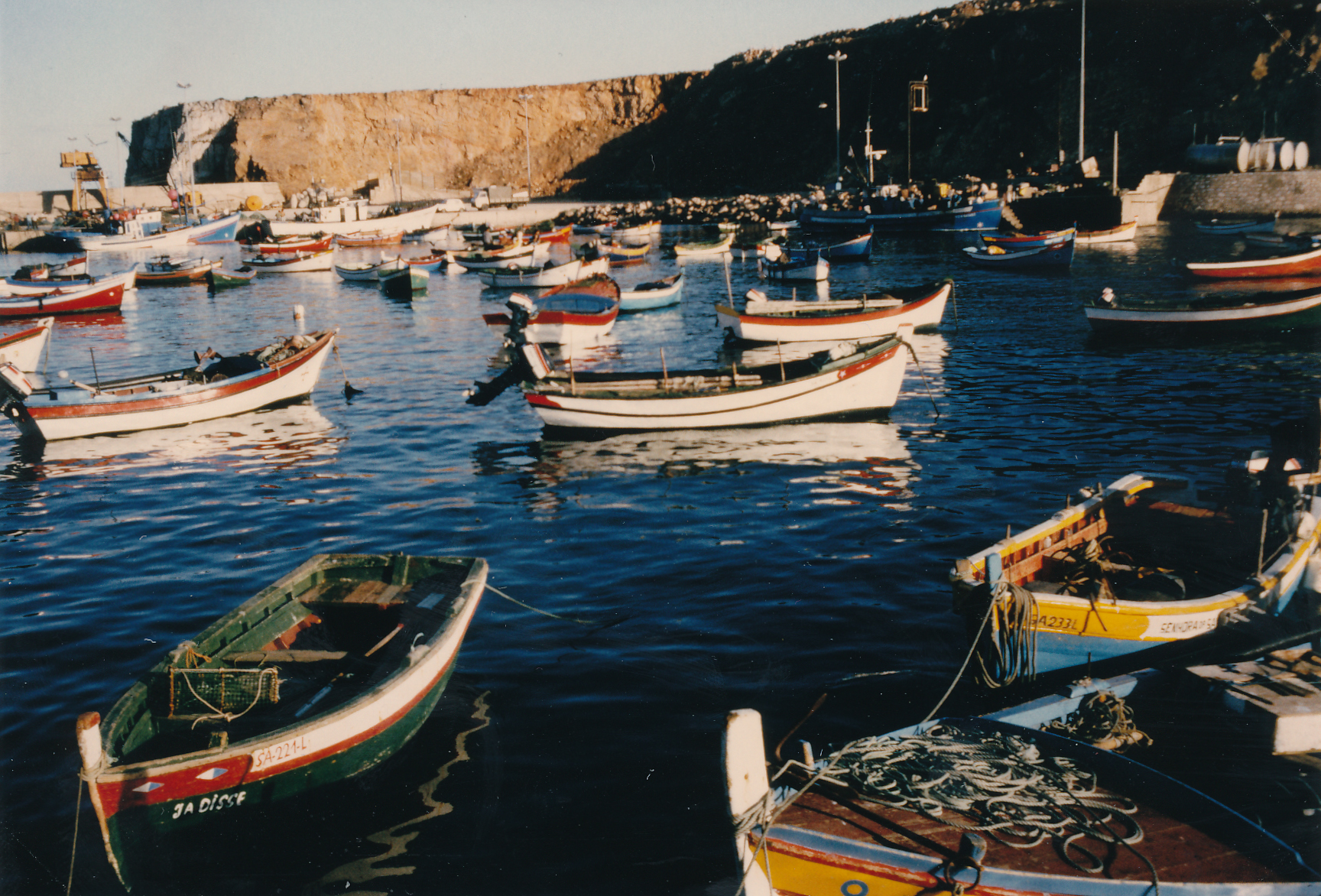
The port of Sagres, historical center of the Portuguese discoveries and fishing port

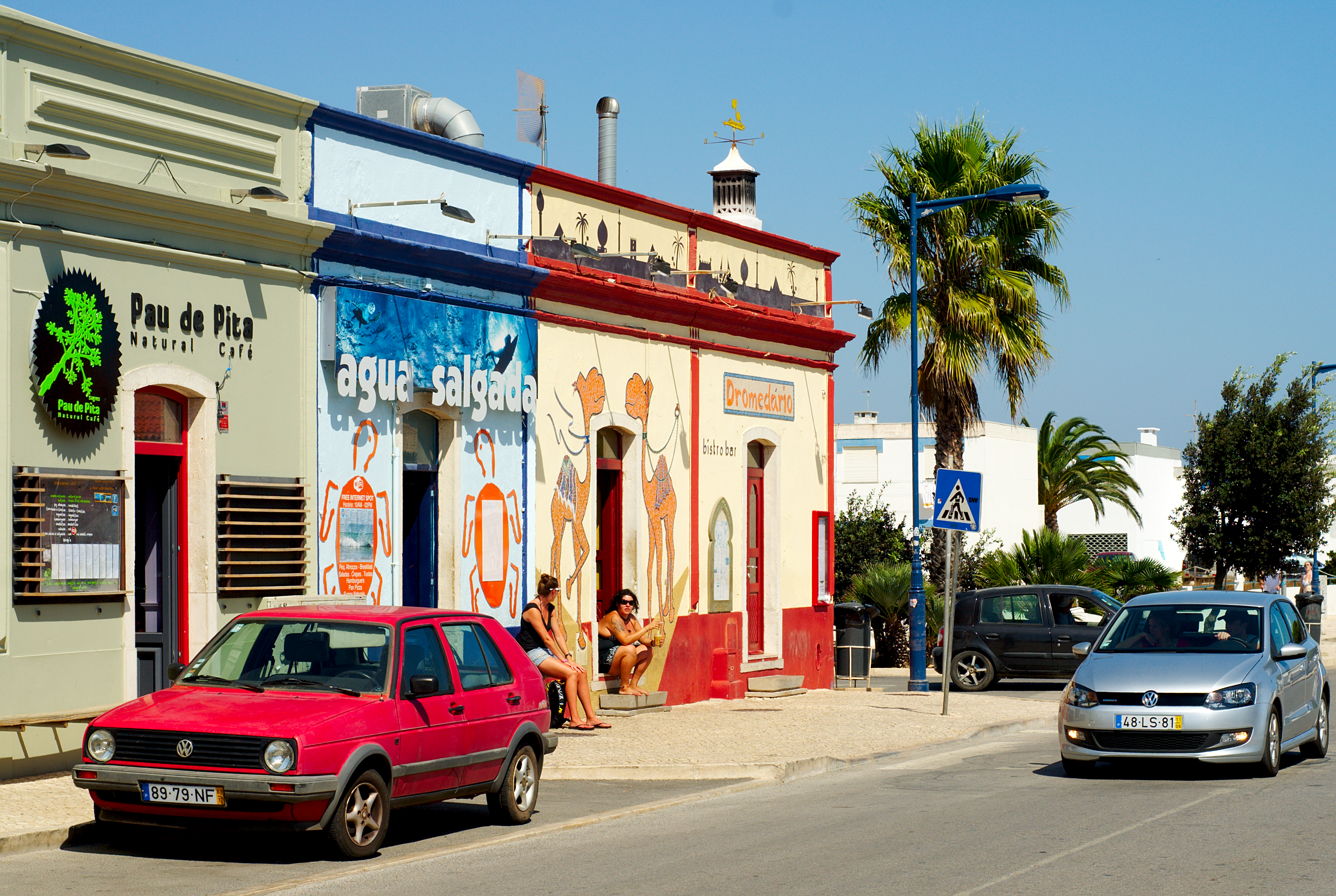
Street in Sagres

The name Sagres derives from Sagrado (holy) owing to the important local religious practices and rituals that occurred during the pre-history of the nation. From here some of the Mediterranean peoples (including the Phoenicians, Greeks, Carthaginians and Romans), venerated their divinities and which some believed, owing to the absence of a human settlement, was the gathering place for their gods. Christians (Mozarabs) that lived in this zone during the Muslim occupation erected the Church of Corvo, where the mortal remains of Saint Vincent were deposited in the 8th century. The presence of the martyr's remains led the Portuguese to refer to the site and the peninsula as the Cape of Saint Vincent.

The area (mostly Lagos town) is linked to Infante Henry, son of King John I and Philippa of Lancaster. Although born in the provincial city of Porto in 1394, he would be associated with the parish, until his death in 1460, being known in Portugal as the Infante of Sagres and "Prince Henry the Navigator" in the rest of Europe. Although there existed a medieval settlement in this area (Terçanabal), all the land was donated on 27 October 1443 to Infante Henry. The prince was head of the military Order of Christ, Duke of Viseu, Master of Covilhã, and a man preoccupied with his signeurial holdings and defense of his faith. Henry obtained his wealth from the lands he held and the fisheries in the Algarve, and the rights from the gold and the African slave trade, and the founding of a village (later known as the Vila do Infante) to assist the population. The small town of fishermen was situated on the Ponta de Sagres, a strategic point dominating the coves of Mareta and Beliche. Henry controlled his material interests from Lagos and when he died on 13 November 1460, the Portuguese navigators and other services had already reached Sierra Leone.

Sagres was created in 1519, through the division of the municipality of Vila do Bispo.

King Sebastian was known to have spent time in the parish, listening to music along the cliffs and the sea. A chronicle of the 16th century referred to the young King's stay at the Convent of São Vicente do Cabo, and later, locals recounted that the King was enchanted by the landscape of Sagres.

In May 1587, explorer and privateer Francis Drake disembarked 800 men who assaulted the fortress of Sagres. After two hours of intense combat, fortifications adjacent to the fortress were destroyed and its artillery was pillaged.

Until 1834, Sagres was an independent municipality.

== Geography ==
Location in the municipality of Vila do Bispo

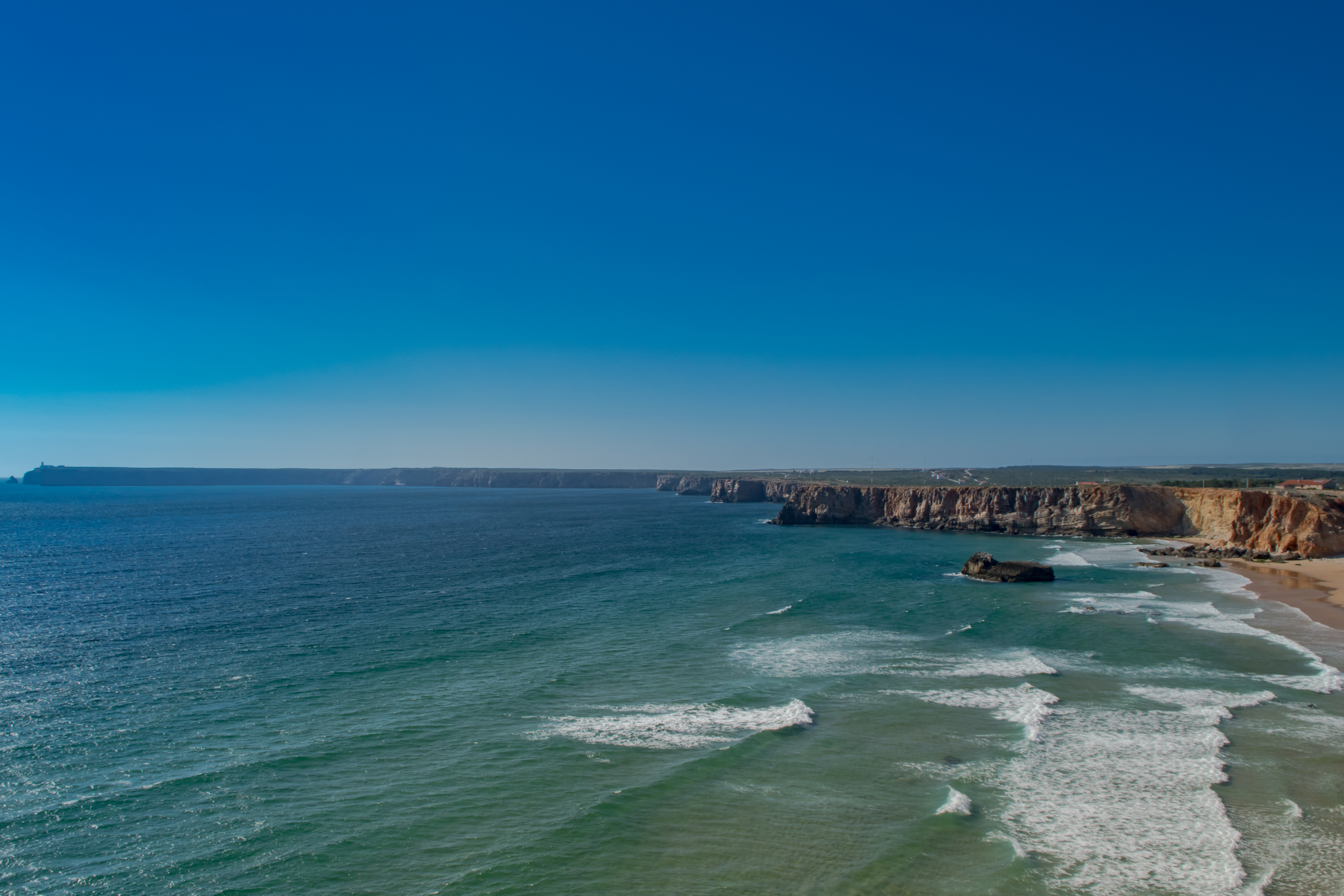
View of the cape (far left) and the beach (far right)

Sagres is located in the extreme southwest of continental Europe, and marked by two geomorphological structures: the Cape St. Vincent and Sagres Point, which establish a transition between the eastern coastal and meridional zones. Exposed to the Atlantic Ocean, it is influenced by Mediterranean currents, marked by promontories of high cliffs leading onto a platform that oscillates between 100–200 metres (330–660 ft) (in the north) and 50 metres (160 ft). Whether by coastal erosion, or the hard rock, its composition influences the relief of the area.

At 157 meters high, Torre de Aspa is a viewpoint on the western side of Vila do Bispo, which offers a panoramic view of Sagres and São Vicente Cape.

== Climate ==
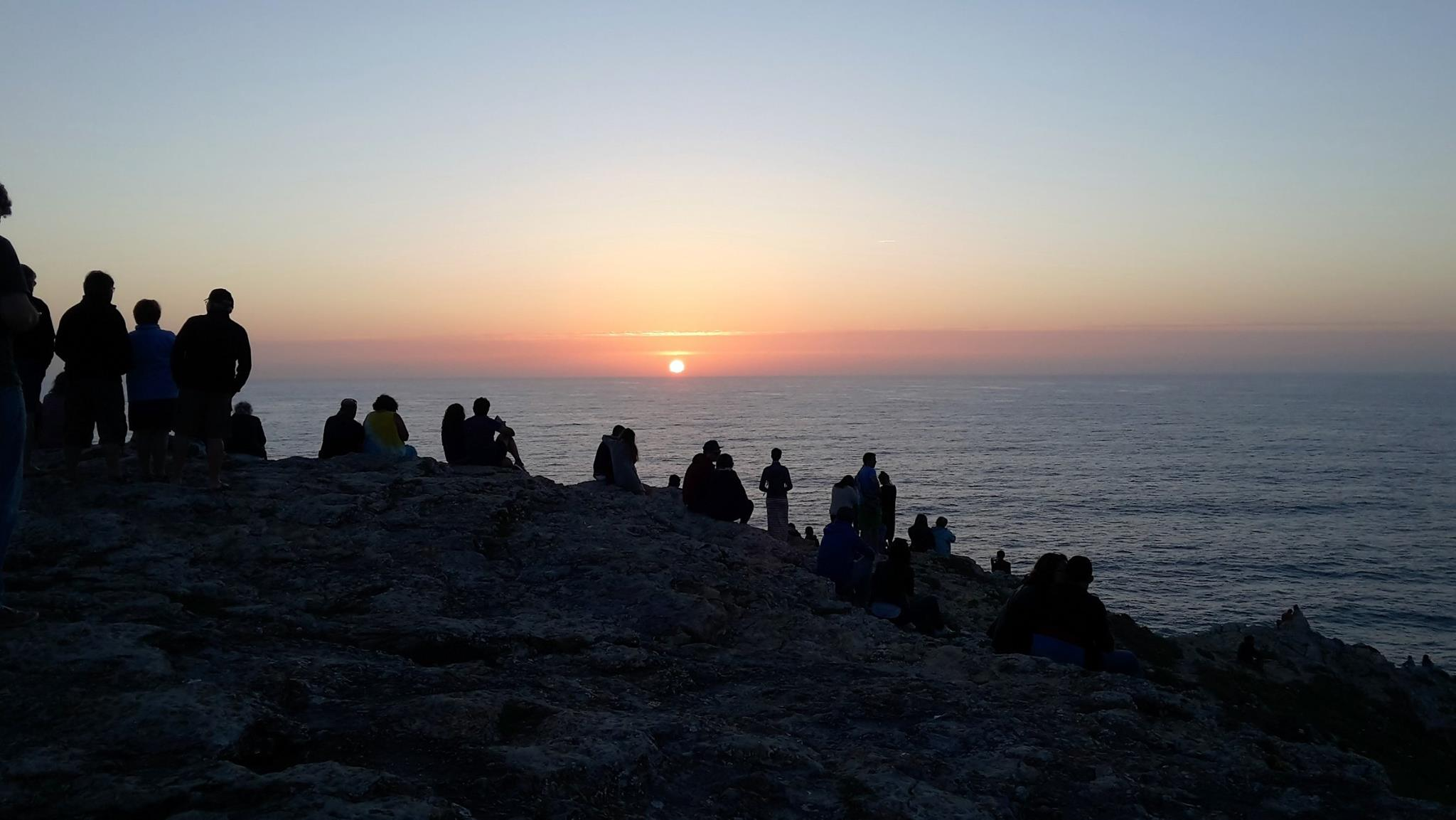
Sagres cape by sunset New Year's Day 2018

Sagres has a borderline warm-summer Mediterranean climate (Köppen Csb), hot-summer Mediterranean climate (Köppen Csa) with mild winters and warm summers. Temperatures are very moderated year-round, seldom above 35 °C (95 °F) or below 4 °C (39 °F) due to the strong upwelling this region experiences in the summer. November and December are the wettest months. Similarly to other locations in the Algarve, insolation is high, though with a higher frequency of marine fogs, which boost the average relative humidity to around 80%.

Climate data for Sagres, elevation: 26 m or 85 ft, normals 1991-2020, extremes 1973-present
Month	Jan	Feb	Mar	Apr	May	Jun	Jul	Aug	Sep	Oct	Nov	Dec	Year
Record high °C (°F)	23.2 (73.8)	26.0 (78.8)	27.8 (82.0)	27.9 (82.2)	35.1 (95.2)	35.5 (95.9)	37.5 (99.5)	40.4 (104.7)	34.3 (93.7)	31.2 (88.2)	27.0 (80.6)	26.0 (78.8)	40.4 (104.7)
Mean daily maximum °C (°F)	16.1 (61.0)	16.3 (61.3)	17.8 (64.0)	19.1 (66.4)	21.5 (70.7)	23.9 (75.0)	25.2 (77.4)	25.9 (78.6)	24.9 (76.8)	22.4 (72.3)	19.0 (66.2)	17.0 (62.6)	20.8 (69.4)
Daily mean °C (°F)	12.3 (54.1)	12.6 (54.7)	14.2 (57.6)	15.5 (59.9)	17.7 (63.9)	20.0 (68.0)	21.1 (70.0)	21.7 (71.1)	20.8 (69.4)	18.7 (65.7)	15.3 (59.5)	13.5 (56.3)	17.0 (62.6)
Mean daily minimum °C (°F)	8.5 (47.3)	8.8 (47.8)	10.6 (51.1)	12.0 (53.6)	13.9 (57.0)	16.2 (61.2)	17.0 (62.6)	17.4 (63.3)	16.7 (62.1)	15.0 (59.0)	11.7 (53.1)	9.9 (49.8)	13.1 (55.6)
Record low °C (°F)	−2.0 (28.4)	−1.4 (29.5)	0.4 (32.7)	4.0 (39.2)	6.0 (42.8)	8.0 (46.4)	8.0 (46.4)	8.6 (47.5)	5.0 (41.0)	5.7 (42.3)	1.8 (35.2)	0.1 (32.2)	−2.0 (28.4)
Average precipitation mm (inches)	53.3 (2.10)	48.5 (1.91)	48.8 (1.92)	34.7 (1.37)	22.1 (0.87)	3.7 (0.15)	1.0 (0.04)	1.5 (0.06)	18.5 (0.73)	61.4 (2.42)	82.0 (3.23)	75.2 (2.96)	450.5 (17.74)
Average precipitation days (≥ 1.0 mm)	7.4	6.3	6.3	5.7	3.9	0.7	0.2	0.4	2.5	6.7	8.4	8.0	56.6
Mean monthly sunshine hours	184.2	191.4	234.7	273.2	328.9	345.3	378.0	343.5	263.7	222.3	169.3	148.6	3,083.1
Source 1: IPMA
Source 2: Météo Climat (sun 1991-2020, extremes 1973-present)

Climate data for Sagres, 1952-1980, elevation: 40 m or 130 ft
Month	Jan	Feb	Mar	Apr	May	Jun	Jul	Aug	Sep	Oct	Nov	Dec	Year
Record high °C (°F)	26.2 (79.2)	20.5 (68.9)	24.5 (76.1)	25.5 (77.9)	30.7 (87.3)	30.1 (86.2)	35.5 (95.9)	33.5 (92.3)	32.0 (89.6)	29.0 (84.2)	27.4 (81.3)	25.8 (78.4)	35.5 (95.9)
Mean daily maximum °C (°F)	15.4 (59.7)	15.4 (59.7)	16.2 (61.2)	17.3 (63.1)	19.2 (66.6)	21.0 (69.8)	22.5 (72.5)	23.2 (73.8)	22.7 (72.9)	20.8 (69.4)	18.0 (64.4)	16.0 (60.8)	19.0 (66.2)
Daily mean °C (°F)	13.0 (55.4)	13.0 (55.4)	13.7 (56.7)	14.7 (58.5)	16.5 (61.7)	18.1 (64.6)	19.5 (67.1)	19.9 (67.8)	19.8 (67.6)	18.2 (64.8)	15.5 (59.9)	13.4 (56.1)	16.3 (61.3)
Mean daily minimum °C (°F)	10.6 (51.1)	10.6 (51.1)	11.2 (52.2)	12.1 (53.8)	13.8 (56.8)	15.2 (59.4)	16.5 (61.7)	16.6 (61.9)	16.9 (62.4)	15.6 (60.1)	13.0 (55.4)	10.8 (51.4)	13.6 (56.4)
Average precipitation mm (inches)	78.4 (3.09)	63.9 (2.52)	52.0 (2.05)	36.2 (1.43)	18.4 (0.72)	7.1 (0.28)	0.3 (0.01)	3.4 (0.13)	12.8 (0.50)	53.5 (2.11)	63.5 (2.50)	66.8 (2.63)	456.3 (17.97)
Average relative humidity (%)	81	80	81	81	81	83	82	81	81	82	80	79	81
Source: IPMA

== Architecture ==
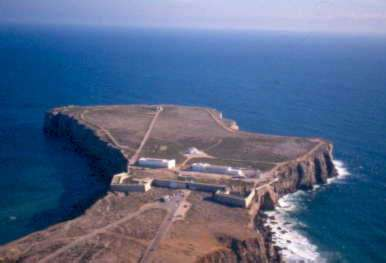
The peninsula and presumed former-site of the Sagres nautical school

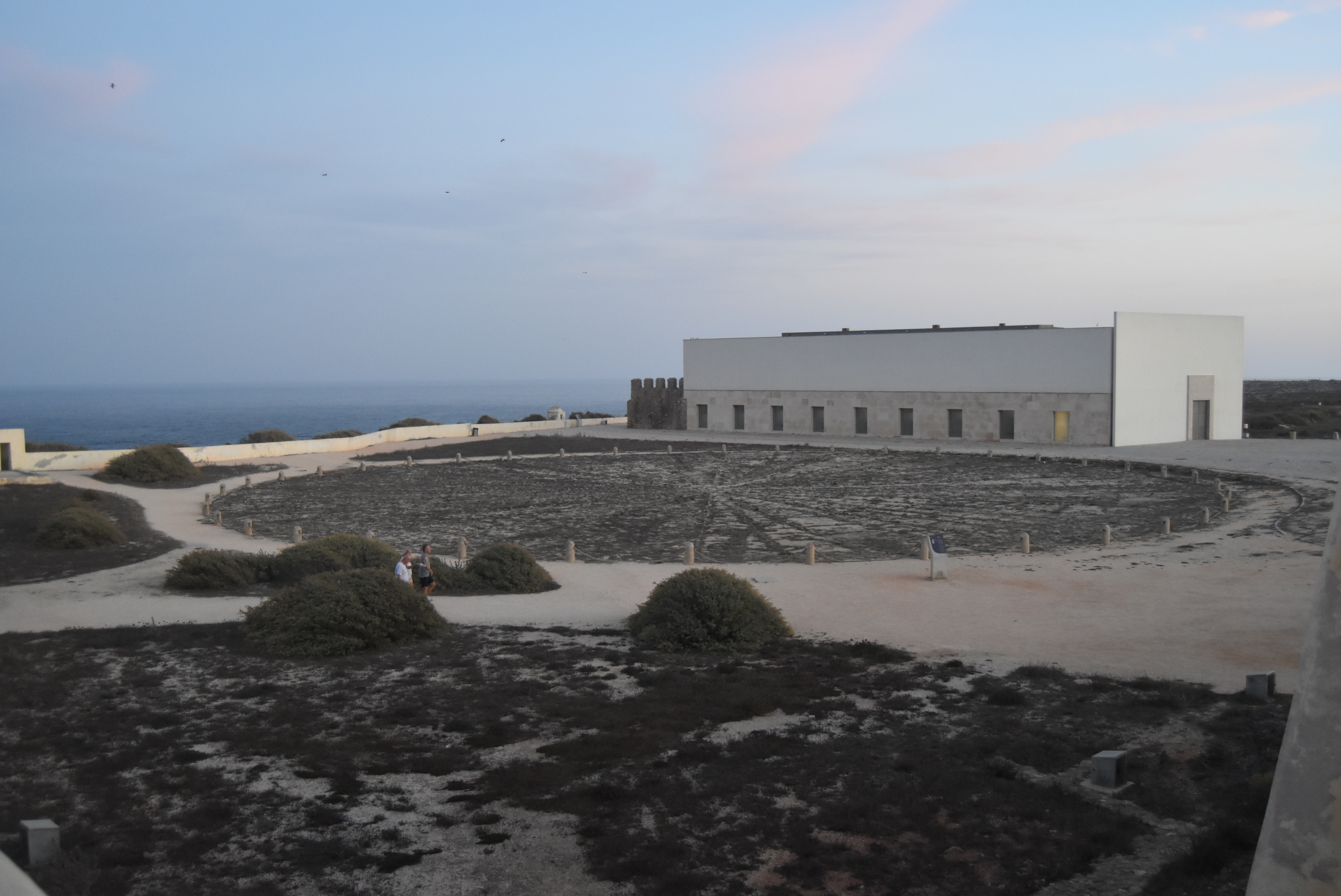
Fortress of Sagres

=== Civic ===
- Fiscal Post of Sagres (Portuguese: Posto Fiscal de Sagres)
- Hotel of Baleeira (Portuguese: Hotel de Baleeira)
- Lighthouse of Ponta de Sagres (Portuguese: Estação Rádio-Goniométrica/Farolim de Sagres/Farol da Ponta de Sagres)
- Lighthouse of São Vicente (Portuguese: Fortaleza do Cabo de São Vicente/Convento do Corvo/Convento de São Vicente do Cabo/Farol de São Vicente)
- Pousada of Sagres (Portuguese: Pousada de São Vicente/Pousada do Infante/Pousada de Sagres)

=== Military ===
- Fort of Nossa Senhora da Buia da Beleeira (Portuguese: Forte de Nossa Senhora da Guia da Baleeira)
- Fort of Santo António de Beliche (Portuguese: Fortaleza do Belixe (ruínas)/Fortaleza de Santo António do Beliche)
- Fortress of Sagres (Portuguese: Torre e muralhas de Sagres/Fortaleza de Sagres), Henry the Navigator ordered the construction of this fortress to protect the strategic coastal position at Ponta de Sagres, and the coves that sheltered shipping. The church of Santa Maria, consecrated in 1519, to the invocation of Nossa Senhora da Graça (Our Lady of Grace) was constructed at the centre of the site, during the reign of King Manuel I of Portugal. A valuable gilded altarpiece from the Chapel of Santo António (in the fort of Beliche), and two images of Saint Vincent and Francis of Assisi, from the 17th and 18th century. The fortification was remodeled in the 16th, 17th and 18th century, after various attacks (including an assault by Francis Drake in 1587); its current form dates to 1793.
