= Fortress of Sagres =

Fortress in Vila do Bispo, Portugal

- Fortaleza de Sagres
- Sagres in Portugal
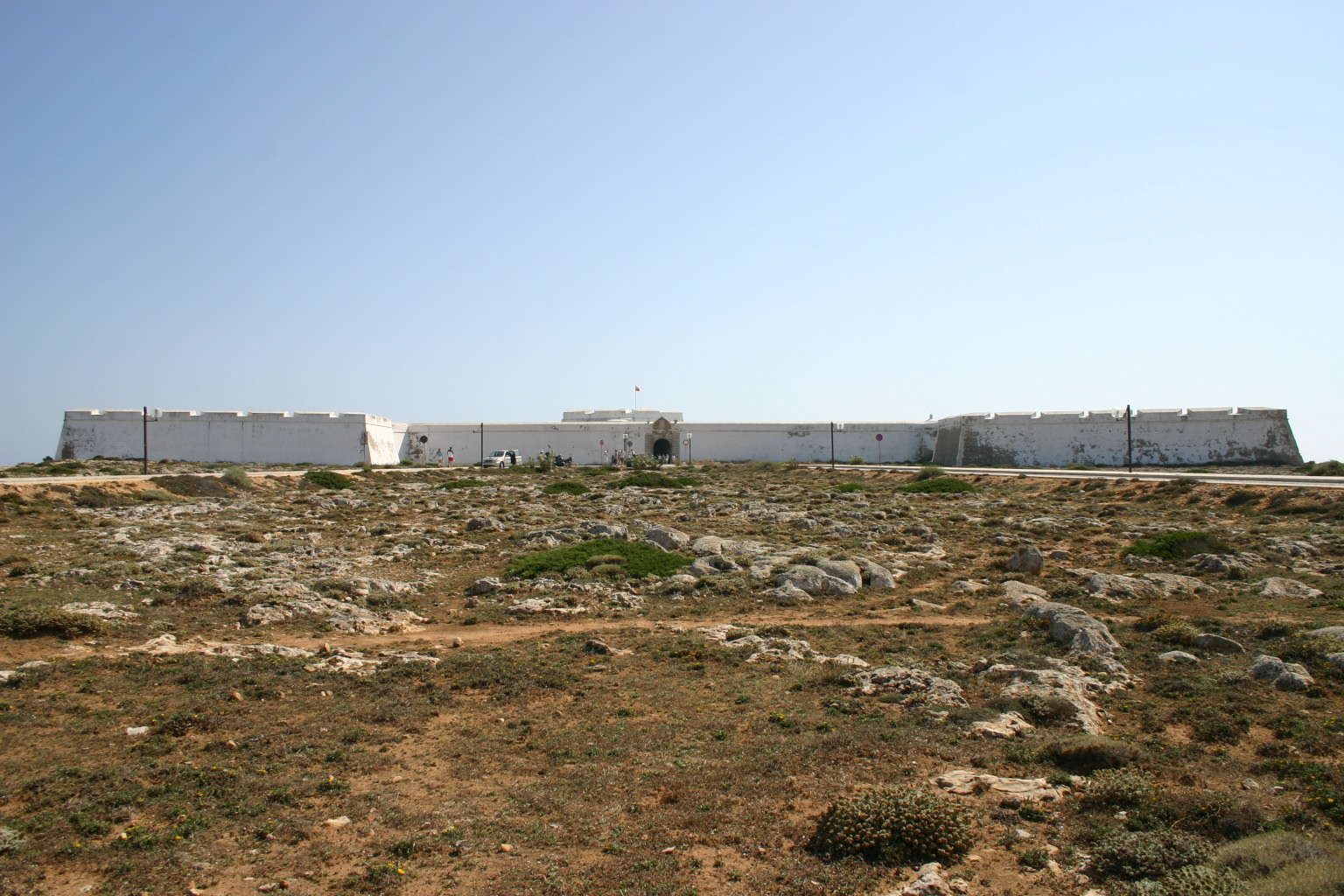

Site information
- Type: Fortress
- Owner: Government of Portugal
- Condition: Museum

Location
- Coordinates: 37°0′2″N 8°56′54″W

Site history
- Built: 1443?
- Built by: Prince Henry the Navigator

The Fortress of Sagres, also known as Castle of Sagres or Fort of Sagres (Portuguese: Fortaleza de Sagres), is a military structure, located near the Sagres freguesia, in the municipality of Vila do Bispo, in the Algarve region of Portugal. The fortress was built in the 15th century by order of Portugal's Infante Henry the Navigator. Heavily damaged in the 1755 Lisbon earthquake, it was rebuilt in the late 18th century albeit with significant remodeling. It underwent major renovations in the 1960s and 1990s and in 2010. Inside, the Church of Nossa Senhora da Graça, also built by Henry the Navigator, stands out. The fortress is of great historical importance because of its connection to the history of Henry the Navigator and Portuguese discoveries. In 2018 it was the most visited monument in the Algarve, probably in the entire region south of the Tagus.

== Panoramic view of the fortress ==
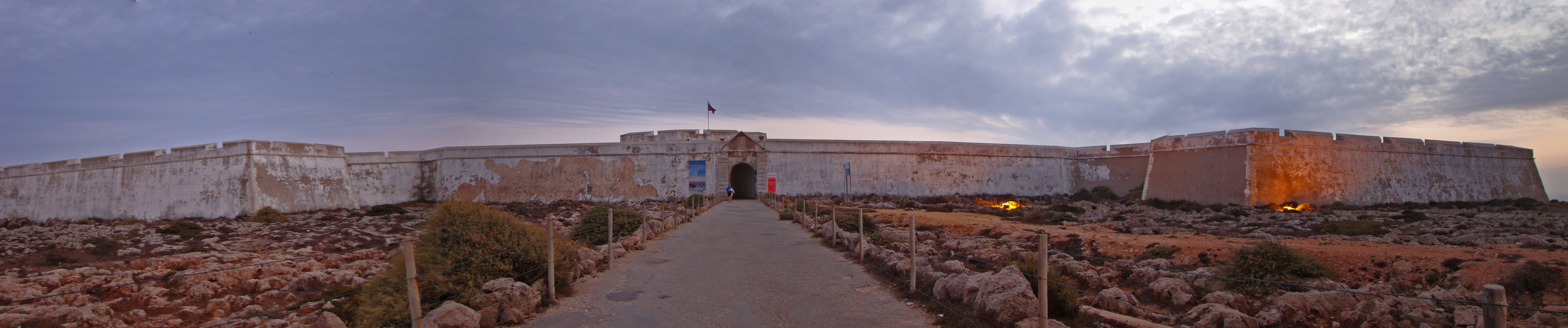

== Description ==
=== Site ===
The fortress is located on a steep promontory to the east of Cape St. Vincent, about 1 km long, 300 m wide and 40 m high, chosen as the site for the erection precisely because of its privileged position of control over the surrounding coastline. The area is now included in the Southwest Alentejo and Vicentine Coast Natural Park, known for its complex faunal and floral biodiversity, with unique specimens in the region.

=== Monumental walls and gates ===
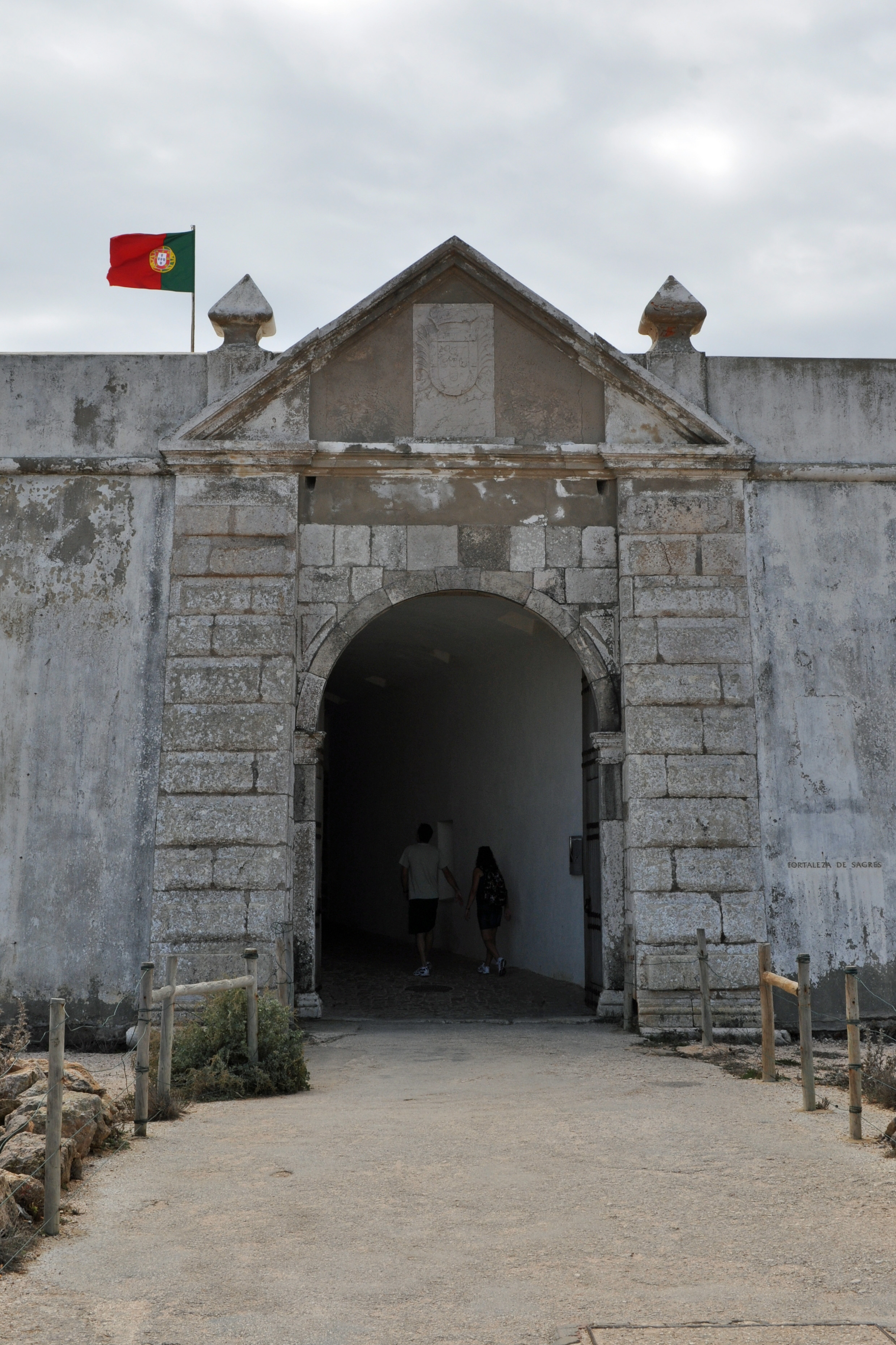
Entrance gate to the fortress in 2012

The fortress features Renaissance-Mannerist architecture. The complex is basically polygonal in shape, comprising an enceinte and six batteries facing the ocean. The walls are surmounted by bastions on both sides and in the center had a turreted cavalier, facing inland, where the main gate of the fortress is situated. The structure bisects the promontory, precluding access except through the castle, whose side ramparts also served as a defense against inland aggression toward the fortress.

This layout, with the fortification closing the only entrance to a rocky promontory, jutting out over the coast or a waterway, is widely witnessed in southern Portugal: see, e.g., Paderne Castle and Arrifana Castle, also in the Algarve, or the castles of Cola and Mértola, in the Alentejo.

In 1843, the cavalier's tower was about 50 palms (11.43 m) high and square in shape, with parapets forming a pentagon, garnished with cannons. In addition to these structures, the fortress also has several batteries and several wheeled cannons.

The neoclassical-style portal has wedges of carved stone masonry, with two padded stones, while the third one served as a plinth. The corners were changed during the restoration work, and their width was changed from 60 cm to 1 m. The portal leads into a tunnel that leads to the inner court, which is now covered with turf. This tunnel already existed in 1843, passing then under the repairs and the central tower, through a vaulted room. This room gave access to the interior of the fortress through a door, near which was also the entrance to the guardhouse, adjacent to the tower. In archaeological investigations, traces of a moat and a drawbridge were discovered at the entrance to the fortress.

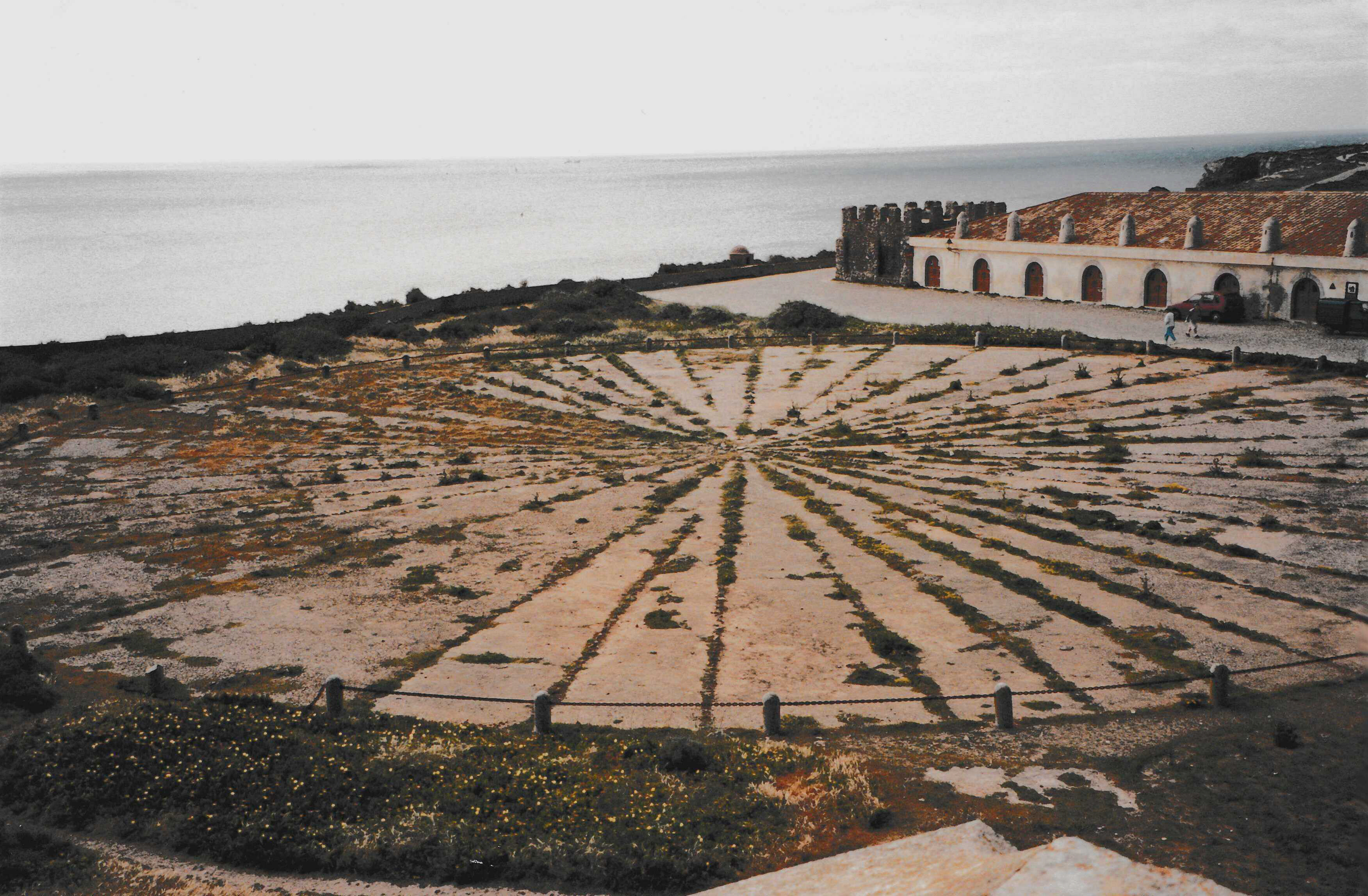
Interior of the Fortress, May 1996. In the center is the so-called Wind Rose, with buildings from the 1960s, replaced in the 1990s, on the right

=== Embankment and buildings ===
There were several buildings within the fortress, including a group called the "creek" that was adjacent to a wall on the south side of the place-of-arms. These buildings consisted of the House of the Cosmograph, the Governor's House and the House of the Infante. Later they were occupied by the House of Captains and several residences and chambers. Outside the place-of-arms, further south, was another property that was identified as a warehouse, and was later used as a stable, the ruins of which remain. There were also several warehouses, several batteries with cannons, and a cistern that is one of the few original remains of the Vila do Infante.

West of the church was a rectangular building with a hipped roof and a single slab on the main facade, with nine doors. The central building was square in shape and originally consisted of two main bodies, both on two floors, connected by a curtain wall. The main facade of the first body had no plinth and ended with a cornice and eaves, with three doors and two windows on the first floor and five windows on the second floor. The second body, to the east of the first, was known as the House of the Governor and was rectangular in shape, with the main facade also lacking a plinth and topped with a cornice, with two doors on the first floor and two windows on the upper floor.

The fortress also had an auditorium.

The fortress complex also includes a circular structure known as the "Rose of the Winds," discovered in the 17th century, which is believed to have been a sundial. It is composed of several unequal-sized stones that form a radiating star with 32 directions. The "Rose" could be connected to a circular hermitage dedicated to St. Mary that would have been built at the behest of the Infante within the village.

To orient and inform visitors, several paths have been created with descriptive panels about the various parts of the monument, plant and animal species on the promontory. A two-kilometer walkway was also installed for visitors with reduced mobility.

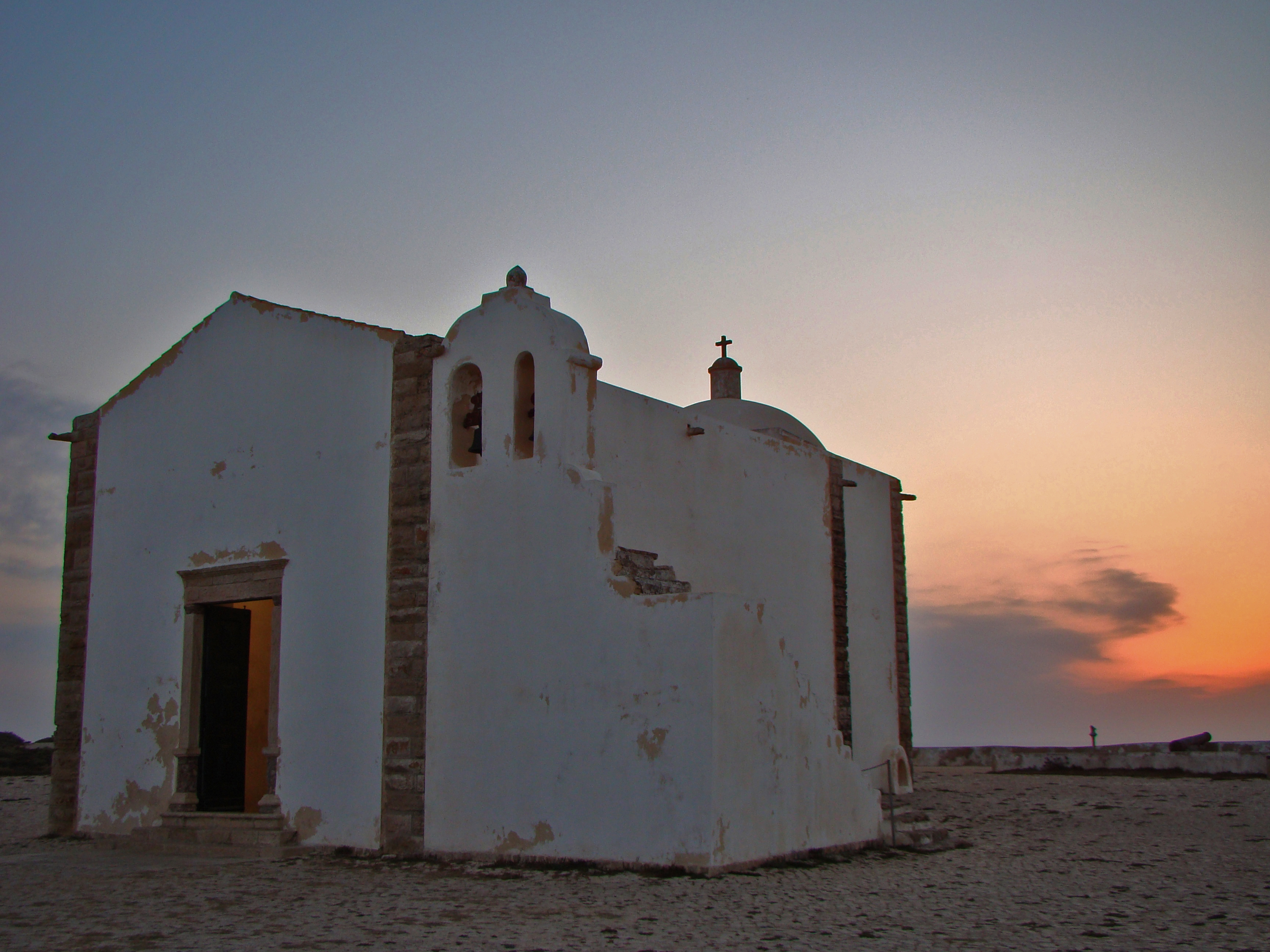
Church of Our Lady of Grace, in 2010

=== Church of Our Lady of Grace ===
Inside the fortress is the Church of Nossa Senhora da Graça, founded during the time of Henry the Navigator and originally dedicated to Saint Mary.

The building has a longitudinal, single-nave plan with a quadrangular apse, with the sacristy to the south in a similar shape. The interior of the nave is covered by a barrel vault, protected by a gable roof, while the chancel is surmounted by a dome on horns. The facades have no basement, the main one having two panes, one of which relates to the church building itself, where the entrance portal with an architrave is located, while the other corresponds to the belfry. The south facade also has two panes, one for the sacristy and the other for the church nave, with a window opening into the latter. The east-facing facade is the same as the south facade, also with a window, and includes a staircase for access to the bell tower.

Inside the church is a series of tombstones.

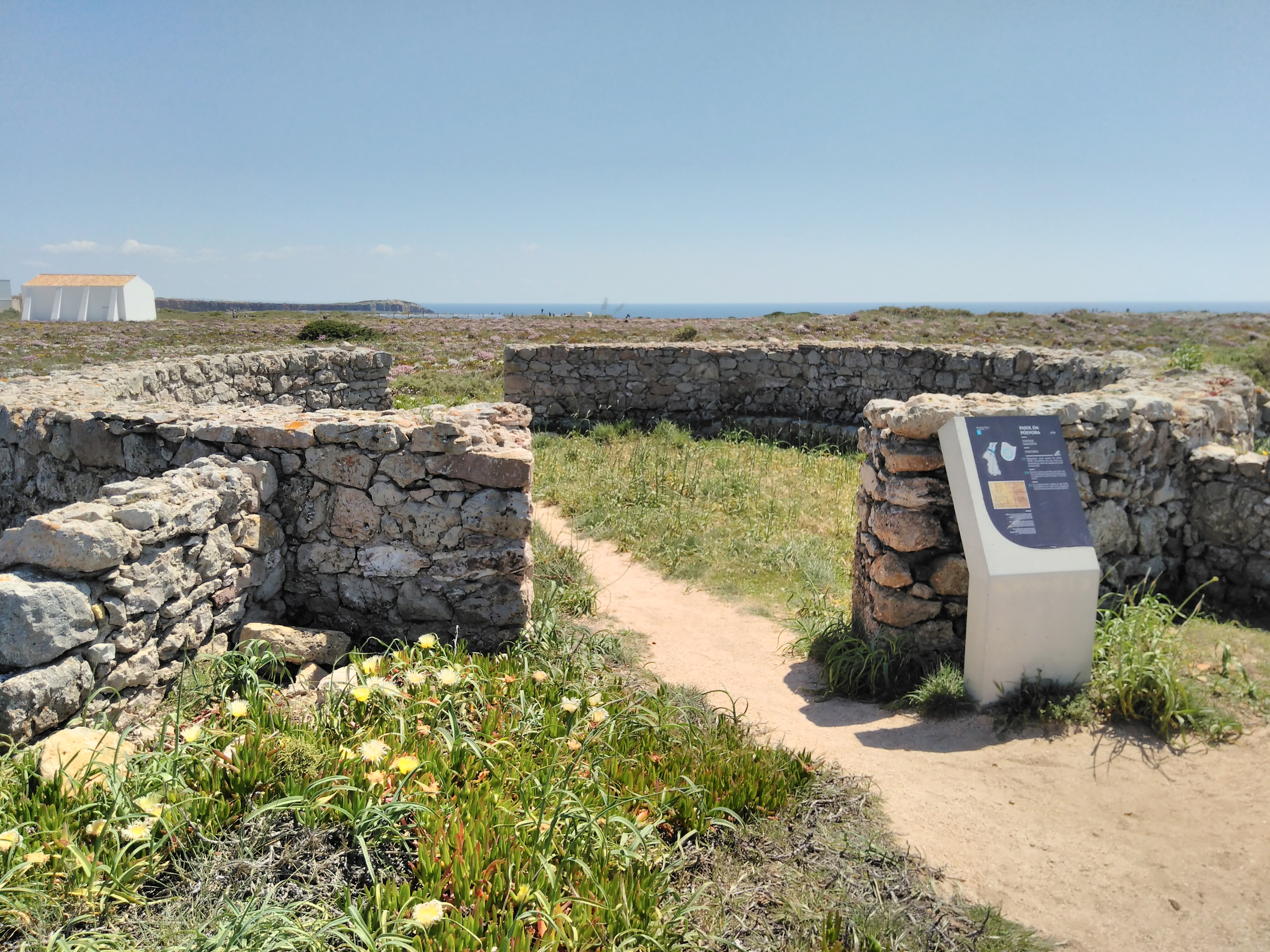
Ruins of the old powder magazine, 2018

=== Preservation and importance ===
The Fortress of Sagres was classified as a National Monument by Decree of June 16, 1910. The Special Protection Zone was delimited by Ordinance No. 469/87, published in the Official Gazette No. 128, Series I, of June 4, 1987. It has also received awards from International Place of Culture and Peace, Human Rights Watch, and European Heritage Label (European Union).

On January 31, 2017, the fortress was named a UNESCO World Heritage Site as part of the First Globalization Places list.

In 2018, the Fortress of Sagres was the most visited monument in the Algarve and probably in the area south of the Tagus River, having recorded nearly half a million visitors that year. The management of the building was entrusted to the Algarve Regional Directorate of Culture by Decree No. 829/2009, published in Diário da República No. 163, Série I, of August 24, 2009.

=== Findings ===
Numerous artifacts were found during the archaeological excavations: ceramic containers, earthenware, building materials, pieces of glass and metal parts.

== History ==
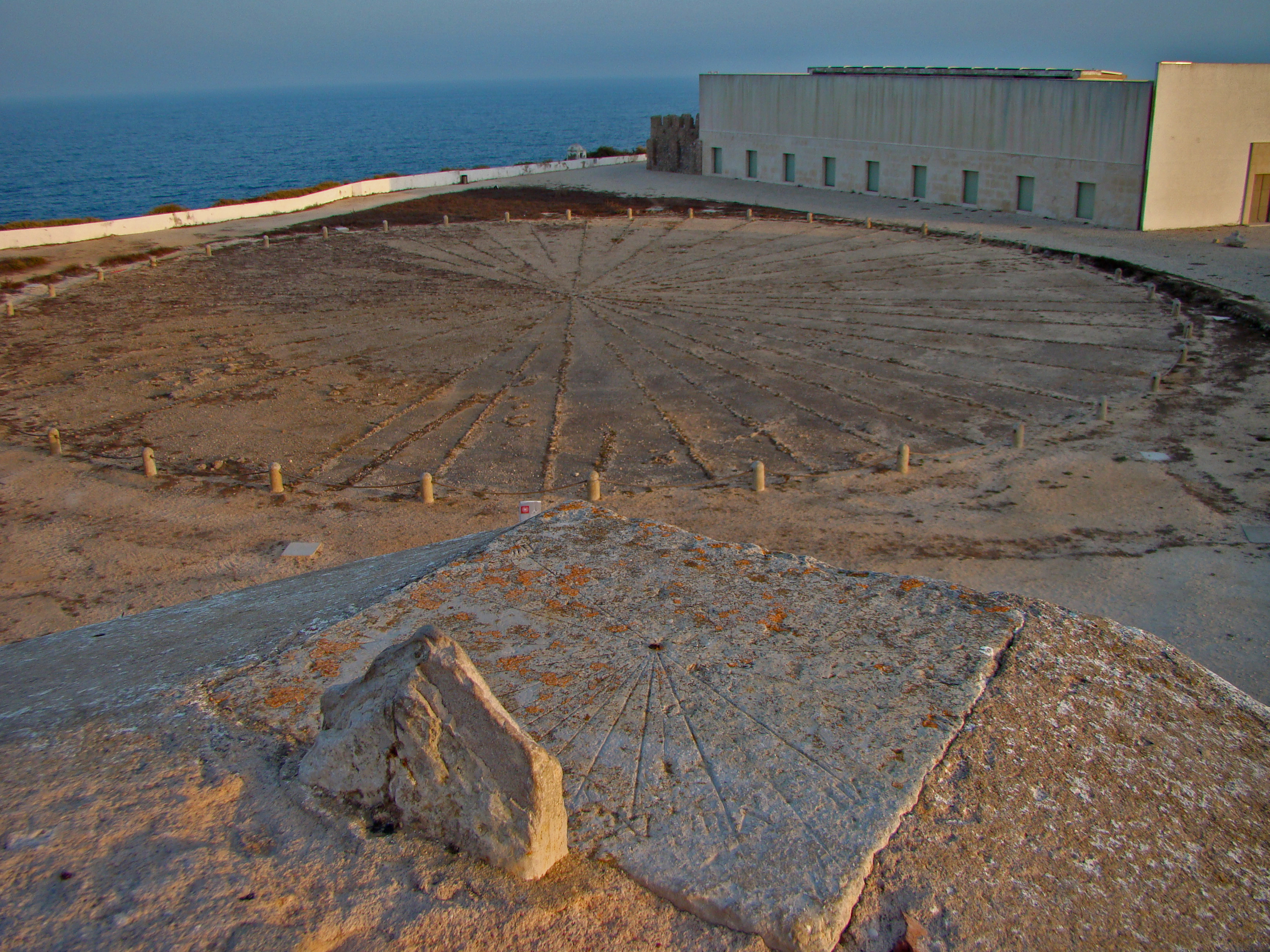
Interior of the fortress - the wind rose

=== Previous structures ===
The area in which the fortress is located has played an important role from a spiritual point of view, because of its geographical location, far from population centers, and its shape, like a large promontory where the land enters the sea. The oldest references are due to the Greek historian Ephorus of Cyme (4th century B.C. ) who called it Hieron Akroterion, a name translated into Latin as Promontorium Sacrum ("Sacred Promontory") by Pliny the Elder in his Naturalis historia. Human occupation of the region dates back to at least the Early Neolithic, according to remains found at the archaeological site of Cabranosa, northwest of the village of Sagres. In Roman times, it is possible that it was a place of worship of the god Saturn or Hercules: several Roman remains have been found in the vicinity (Praia do Beliche, Ilhéus da Baleeira or Martinhal, and Praia da Baleeira). The area gained great importance from a spiritual point of view as the alleged burial place of St. Vincent after his martyrdom by the Roman official Dacian. During the Muslim period there may have been a building dedicated to the worship of that saint, described by the geographer Muhammad al-Idrisi as the Temple of the Raven. This temple would have been frequented mainly by Mozarabs, functioning until the 12th century, when the saint's mortal remains were transferred to Lisbon by order of King Afonso I of Portugal.

=== 15th century ===
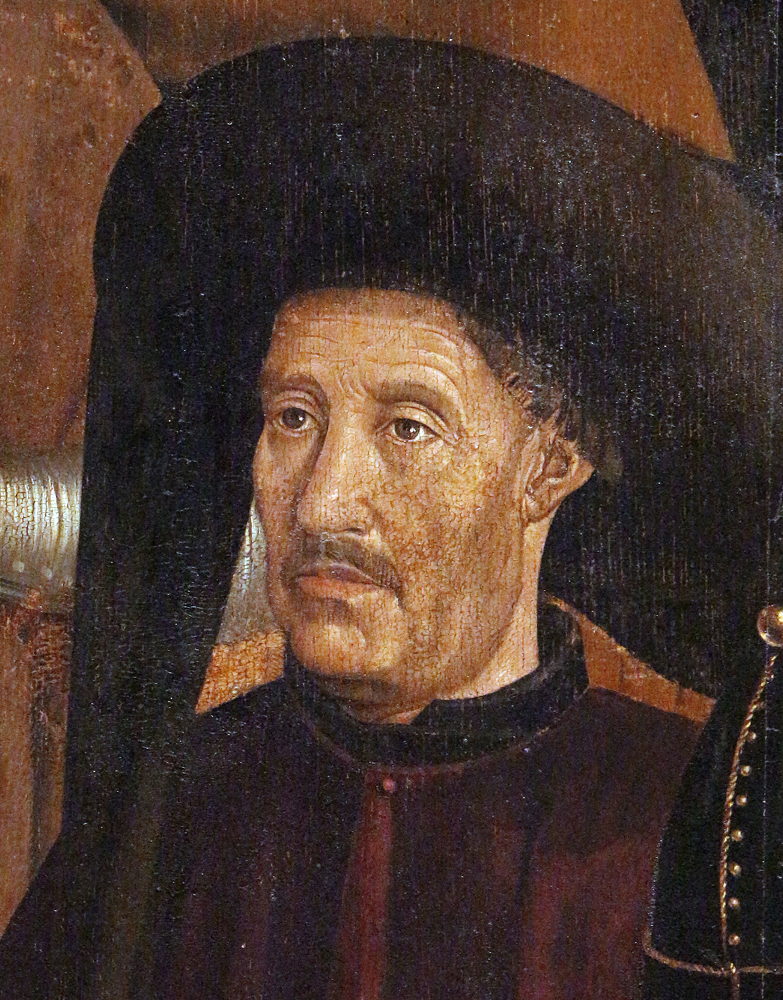
Henry the Navigator

In 1438, Infante Henry the Navigator was in the Algarve region after his military defeat in Tangier the previous year, and he may have been interested in the Cape St. Vincent region at that time. Indeed, there is evidence that the Infante stayed several times in the town of Lagos, then the main port hub of Lusitanian exploration, and he may have used the stay to deepen his knowledge of the cape. It is therefore possible that at that time he matured the idea of creating a residence for himself in Sagres. It was not until October 27, 1443, however, that the Crown of Portugal granted the territory of Cape St. Vincent to Infante Henry for life. At that time, the region was practically uninhabited, a 1434 diploma from Edward of Portugal had described it as a "lonely and deserted place, far from villages," and it was the Infante who manifested his intention to colonize it by erecting one or more villages there.

In the years that followed, Henry undertook to create his own land holdings in the Sagres region, and in 1961 historian Alberto Iria advanced a theory about the original location of the village founded by the Infante as his official residence. A site that would have consisted of several buildings surrounded by a wall, in the same place where the fortress of Sagres was later built. Several vestiges of the original masonry were later discovered at the site. The original complex, according to graphic sources left to us by Drake's Englishmen in the 16th century, had a central building with a small staircase and two visible fireplaces that was possibly the palace of the Infante. The Henrician community was not yet known as "Sagres," and the Infante himself called it Vila do Infante ("village of the Infante") or "my town of Terçanaball/Terçanaval," names that did not correspond exactly to the village but rather to the region in which it was located. In 1459, the Infante moved to Barlavento Algarvio, where he remained until his death, and devoted himself there to, among other things, the development of his village of Terçanabal. At that time, the village was still considered an unpleasant place, although it experienced some growth in the 1450s, mainly due to the Infante's companions (e.g., the Venetian navigator Alvise Da Mosto had arrived there in 1454) and several people who were exiled there. Because of this population increase, the Infante had the parish of Santa Maria erected on October 14, 1459, "in a place once wild and then populated," which was handed over to the Order of Christ. The Infante died on November 13, 1460, in his village of Sagres.

After the death of Henry the Navigator, the city entered a period of decadence and changed administrators several times until the end of the reign of John II of Portugal in 1495. On October 29, 1471, King Afonso V gave the fiefdom of the city, up to Cape St. Vincent, to Rui de Sousa, while on June 22, 1487, an inhabitant of Raposeira, Rodrigo Anes, received the benefit of the captaincy of the village of Sagres. On April 1, 1495, he was granted the highest alcaidaria by King John II. In 1498, Rui de Sousa's son, João de Sousa, inherited the lordship of Sagres upon his father's death, later passing it on to his descendants, the Counts of Prado and the Marquises of Minas.

The fortress of Sagres was probably built in the 15th century to defend the Algarve coast, mainly the west coast, and the sea routes between the Atlantic Ocean and the Mediterranean Sea. It was considered the most important element of the coastal defense system, having two other nearby fortresses, Belixe and São Vicente, in support. It also served to defend the port of Sagres, involved not only in Portuguese exploration activity but also (and especially) an important hub of the Lusitanian fishing industry. The Church of Nossa Senhora da Graça was also built during the Henrician period.

==== Sagres school ====
According to tradition, in addition to the village, the Infante would also establish a navigation school in Sagres, the so-called "Sagres school." However, the Village of the Infante did not start functioning until around 1446, several years after the first major advances in African coastal navigation were made, such as the passage of Cape Bojador by Gil Eanes, which debunks the myth of the Sagres school. This tradition has been sensibly based on historical events, as the cape was one of the inspirations for the Infante to initiate African sailings, so Sagres can be said to have played a primordial role in the beginning of Portuguese discoveries. However, the existence of the Sagres school cannot be completely ruled out, although to be scaled down and/or relocated, for example to the nearby city of Lagos, the real center of sailings in Henry's time.

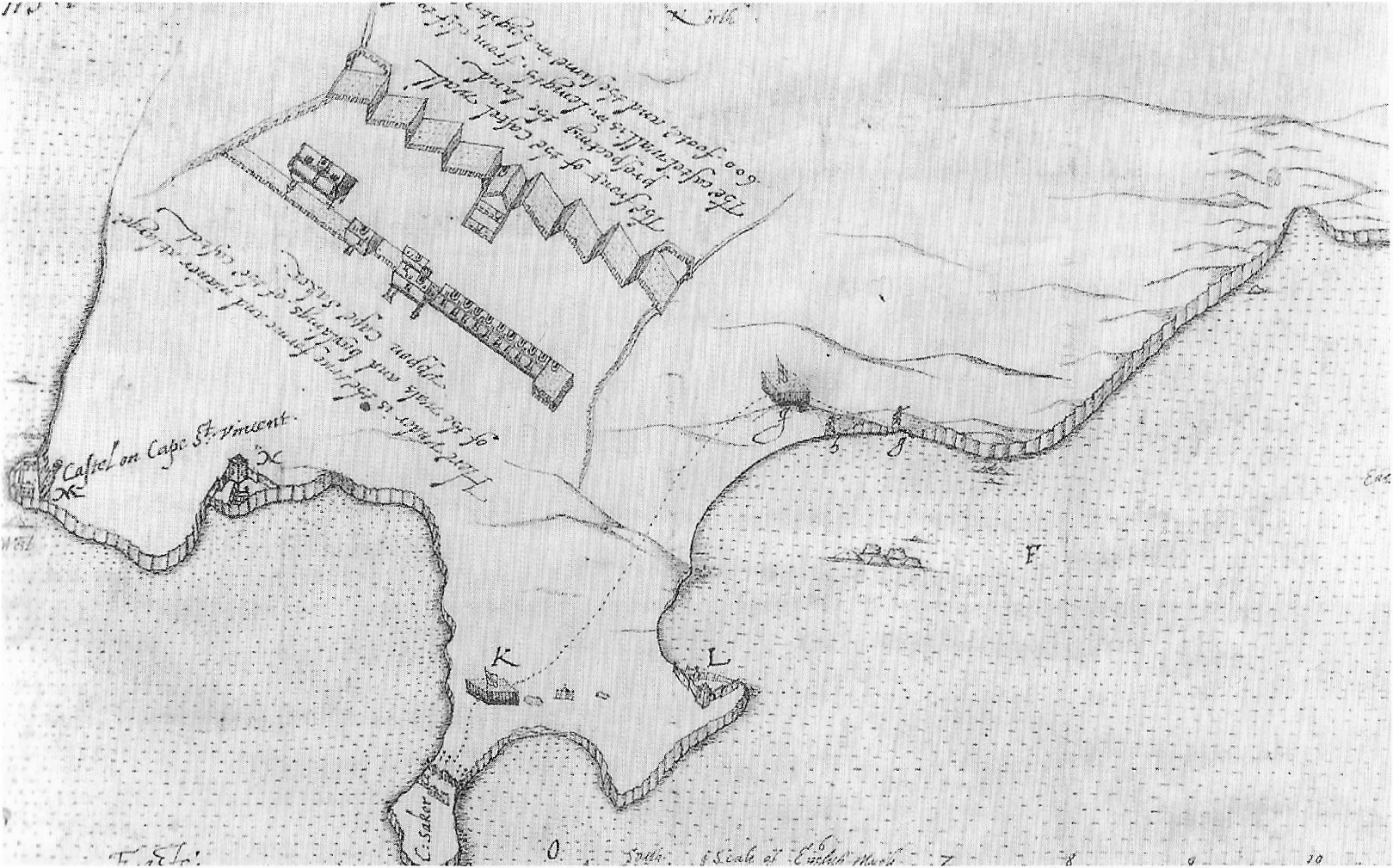
English engraving from 1587 showing the region of Cabos de Sagres and São Vicente. The fortress is depicted twice, in its location in the center and background and then in detail in the center left of the image.

=== 16th century ===
Initially Sagres was not a parish and the inhabitants had to travel to the distant village of Aldeia do Bispo for religious services. This inconvenience was solved with the founding of the parish on November 12, 1519 at the behest of King Manuel I of Portugal, who also ordered the construction of a parish church on the site. It was hoped that these measures would halt the gradual decline of Sagres, increasingly a pure site of military significance. On October 4, 1521, Rodrigo Anes' son Alexandre de Freitas received the ranks of captain and chief mayor of the city of Sagres. After his death in Azemmour, these functions were transferred to his brother Manuel de Freitas who took office on July 19, 1536 and was in turn replaced by Belchior Barreiros. Sagres had a small municipality that was later annexed to the one of Vila do Bispo, having at that time destroyed most of the documents and books of the former municipality.

In 1587, the English privateer Francis Drake made several raids along the Algarve coast: he sacked the village of Sagres and destroyed much of the fortress. The English, before the sacking, depicted the fortress, providing us with probably the oldest visual evidence of the fortification.

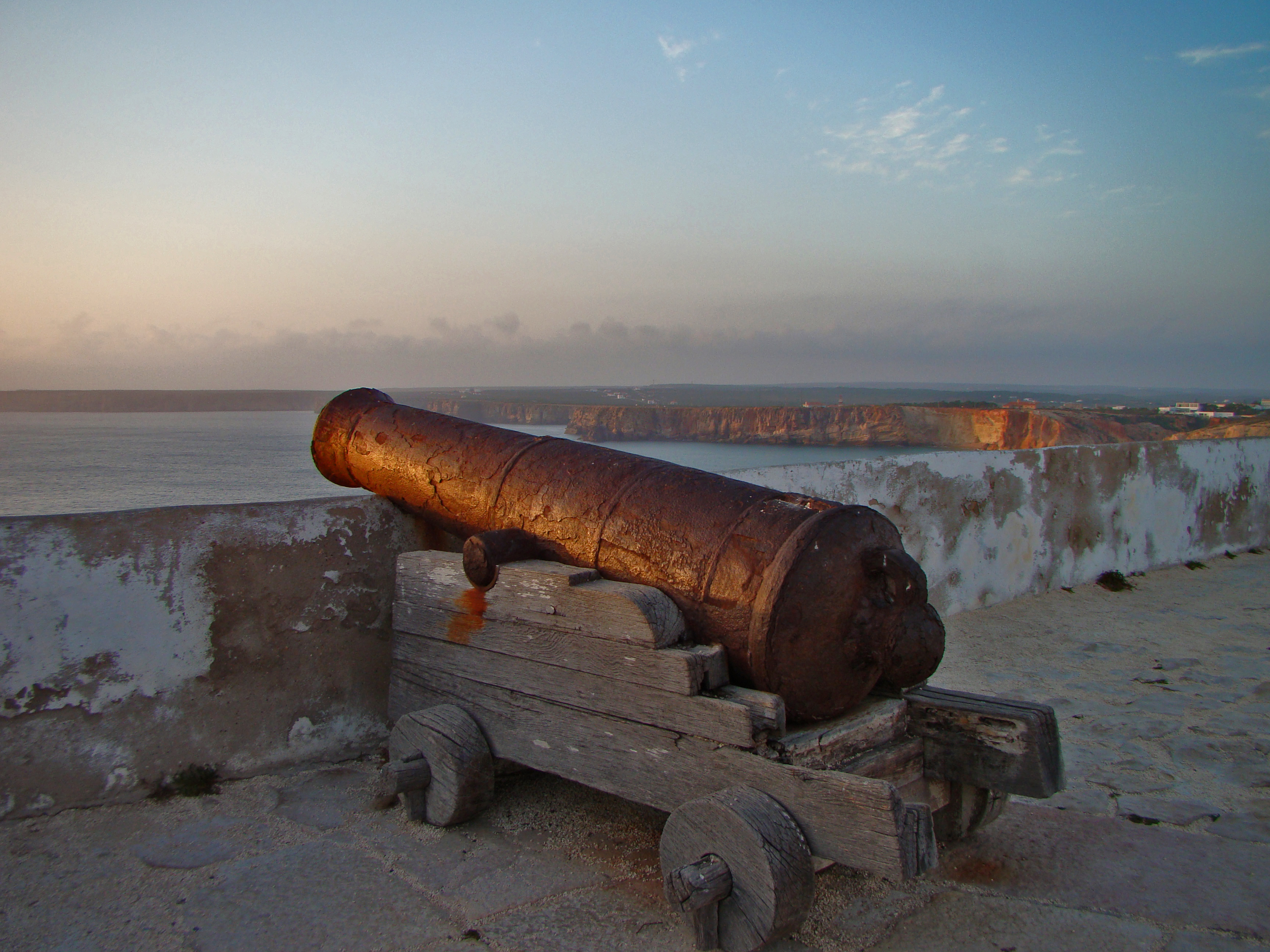
Cannon inside the fortress

=== 17th and 18th centuries ===
In 1631, King Philip III of Portugal and Spain ordered the repair of some parts of the walls that had been knocked down, on the outer side of the fortress. According to historian Ataíde Oliveira, the fortresses of São Vicente and Sagres were subdued without resistance soon after the Restoration of Independence on December 1, 1640, which freed the country from Spanish rule. After 1640, an outer fortified structure was installed, following the system of the Count of Pagan. Also in the 17th century, the so-called "Rose of the Winds" was discovered.

The Sagres complex was severely damaged in the 1755 Lisbon earthquake that destroyed the original walls. Reconstruction work was only carried out starting in 1793, coordinated by José de Sande Vasconcelos, who followed a new model, bringing profound changes in the layout of the fortress. The work focused mainly on the Barracks, the "Governor's House," the building adjoining the cistern, the church, the military storehouses, and the outer wall. These works were commemorated on a plaque that was placed above the entrance to the fortress. According to archaeological investigations carried out in 2008 and records, the structures of the access tunnel and the central turret were built over a period of about 24 years, in the transition from the 18th to the 19th century, although traces of earlier construction, probably from the old Henrician wall, remain on the north wall of the central turret.

=== 19th and 20th centuries ===
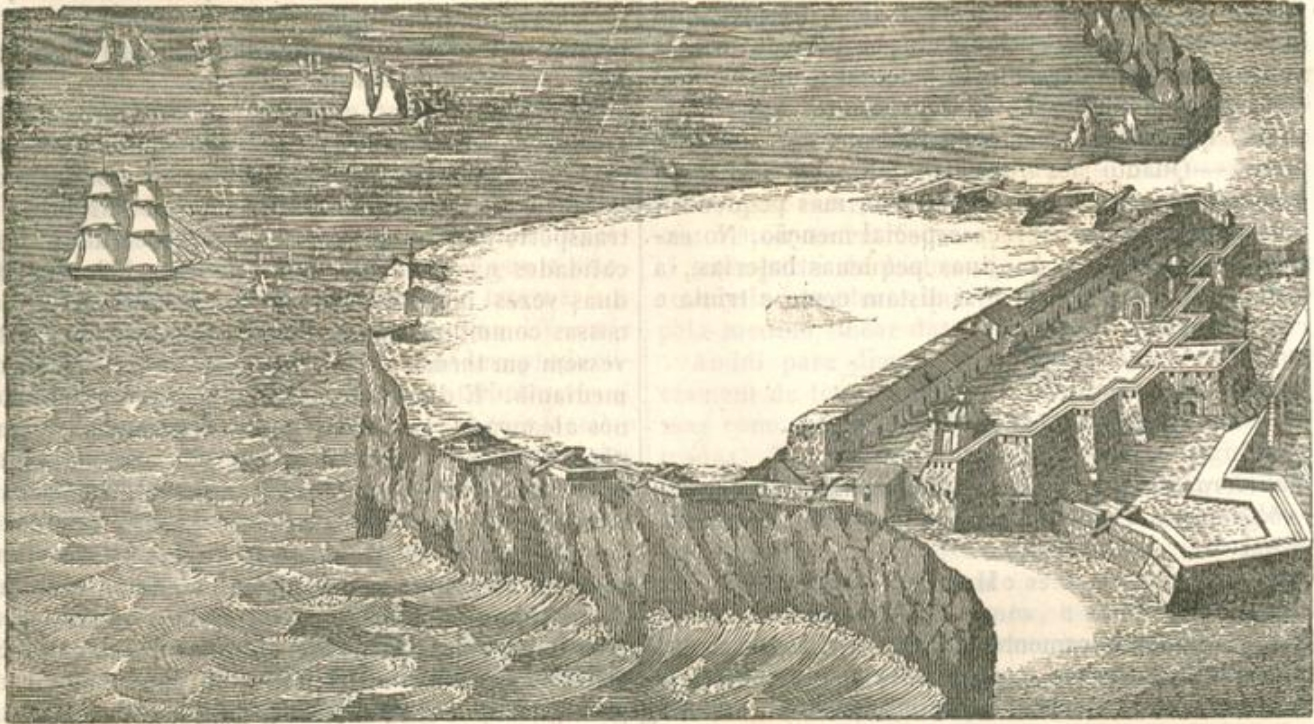
The Fortress of Sagres - ill. from O Panorama n. 71 based on the engraving of Drake's men.

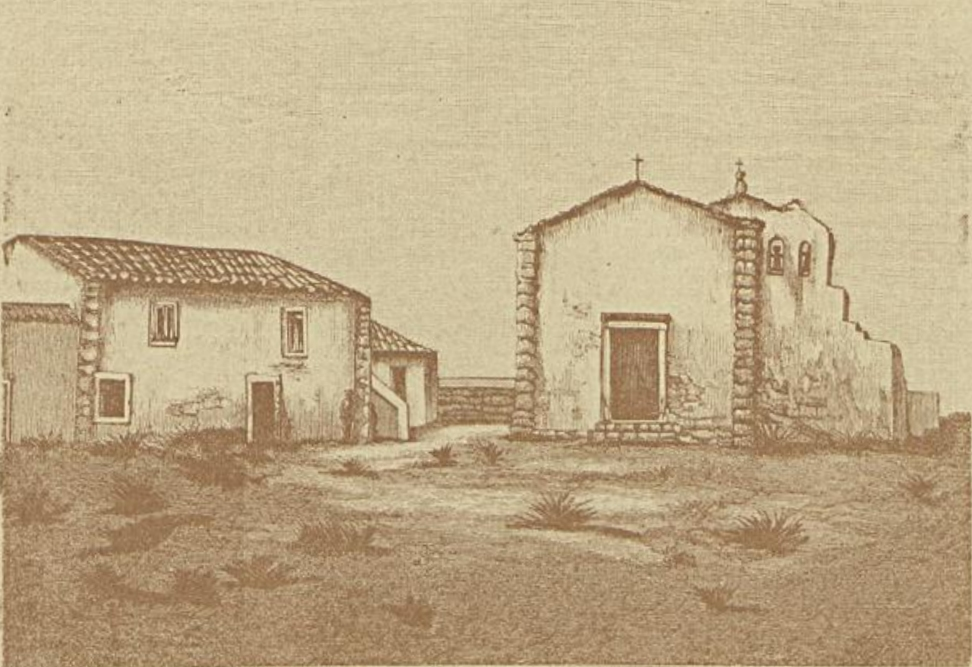
Engraving of a house and chapel inside the Fortress, taken from the newspaper O Ocidental No. 548, 1894

In 1840, a memorial plaque of Henry the Navigator was installed near the entrance to the fortress, at the initiative of Sá da Bandeira. By 1843 Sagres was a place of reduced population, while the fortress itself had lost much of its importance, having only a tiny garrison, and no longer possessing the moat. The promontory and the fortress were described in the work Un'excursion au cap Saint-Vicent et au cap Sagres, published by Germon de Lavigne in 1886, noting that at that time it was occupied only by a small detachment of infantry, part of the Lagos garrison. By the end of the nineteenth century and throughout the twentieth century, the fortress no longer had any defensive functions.

Having lost its strategic function, the fortress gained importance as a symbol of Portugal in the Age of Discovery. On June 16, 1910, the fortress was recognized as a Portuguese national monument. In 1921, the so-called "Rose of the Winds" was rediscovered.

The fortress' connection with the Age of Discovery and Henry the Navigator earned it special attention during the period of the "Estado Novo," which had as one of its main ideologies the exaltation of Lusitanian historical past and considered Infante Henry one of the greatest national heroes. One of the biggest propaganda events of the Estado Novo was precisely the Centennial Commemorations of 1940 in which the Navigator played a preponderant role. While organizing the celebrations, it was resolved to build a monument to the Infante inside the Fortress of Sagres, and several unsuccessful competitions were opened between the 1930s and 1950s.

In the 1960s, for the Navigator's 500th anniversary, the General Directorate for Buildings and National Monuments carried out the first restorations of the fortress, by then in an advanced state of decay: the intervention included the restoration of the interior buildings that tradition dated to the Navigator's period, one of which became the headquarters of the Center of Ultramarine Studies while the Governor's House became a women's dormitory for Portuguese youth and in a third, more recent building, the tourist information office, the guardhouse and accommodation for the lighthouse keepers were installed. The church was restored and an auditorium was created to show documentaries about Infante Henry. It was then that the corners of the entrance portal were enlarged. At the same time, historical documents on the origins of Sagres and the fortress were studied to discover the original location of the Village of the Infante. Fontoura da Costa, who was involved in the work, argued that the Henrician city was located in more or less the same place where the fortress was later built, and it was therefore hypothesized that the oldest remains found (the "Rose of the Winds," a section of inner wall, partially hidden by the ensemble of houses, known as the "creek") were part of the Village. One of the main bases for the reconstruction of the buildings was the English engraving of 1587 as the oldest known representation of the fortress. These works generated some controversy over the authenticity of the heritage and the restoration methods used, with the reconstruction of the buildings criticized as an attempt to recreate an authenticity that never existed. On May 17, 1962, a Special Protection Zone was created around the fortress, which was amended by Ordinances No. 550/86 and No. 469/87. On February 28, 1969, an earthquake caused severe damage in the Algarve, not sparing the fortress.

In the 1980s, the General Directorate for Buildings and National Monuments restored the fortress several times and in 1988 announced a competition to adapt it to tourist demand.

In 1991 new buildings began to be constructed inside the fortress during Pedro Santana Lopes' tenure as Secretary of State for Culture. The work provoked an outcry from locals who criticized João Carreira's design with modern lines, and the controversy blocked the construction of part of the new buildings: a 260 m corridor (8 m high and 6 m wide) to show the Via dos Descobrimentos. Decree-Law 106F of June 1, 1992 created the Portuguese Institute of Architectural Heritage, under whose responsibility the Fortress of Sagres was placed. In 1996-1997 new interventions, again designed by Carreira, improved the exterior arrangement of the monument and covered the outer walls with the current white paint. The new buildings were inaugurated on July 12, 1997, during Manuel Maria Carrilho's term as Minister of Culture. At the end of 1997, the altarpiece of the Catarina Chapel inside the Fortress of Belixe was transported to the Fortress of Sagres for security reasons.

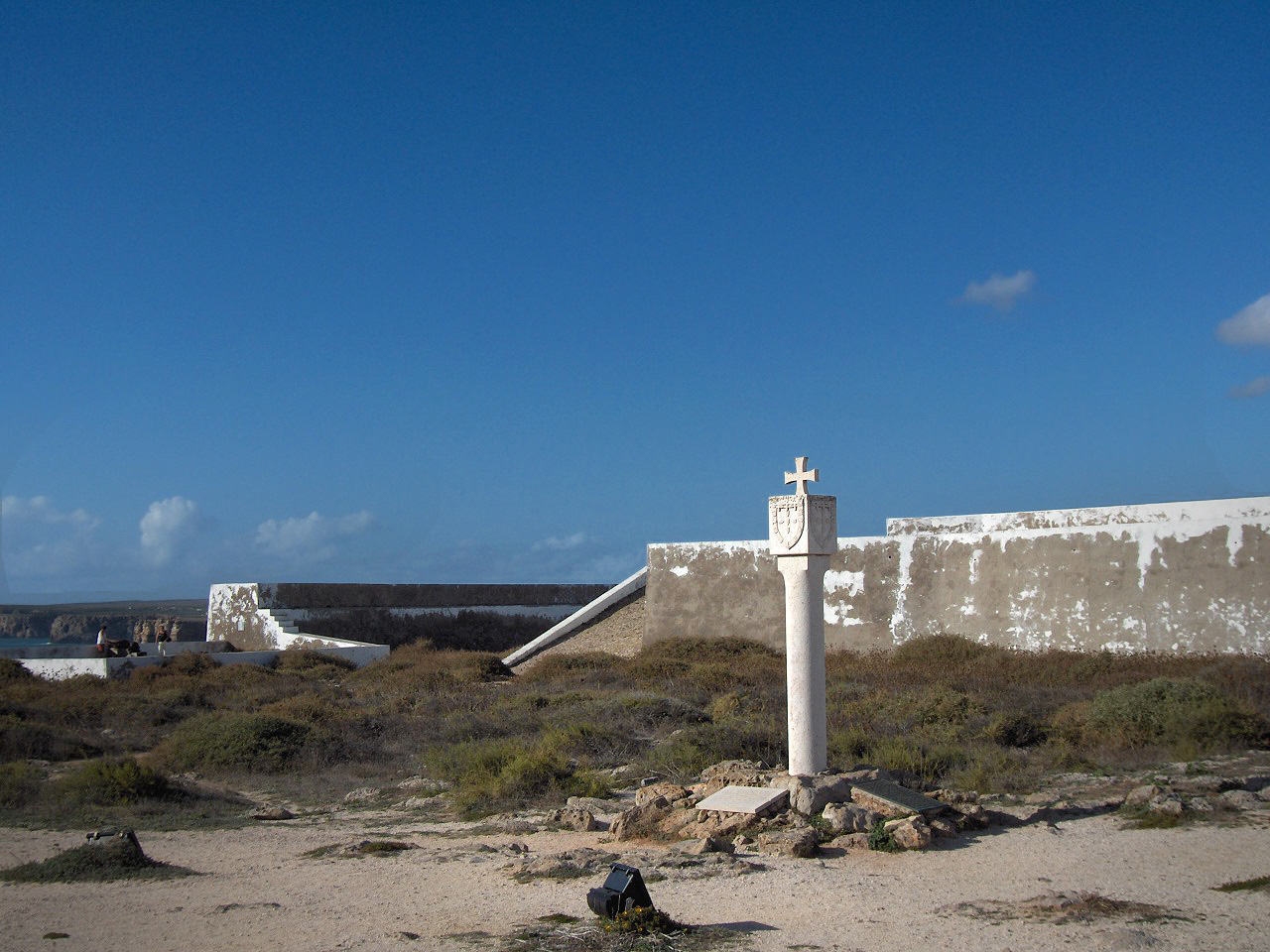
Padrão commemorating Portuguese discoveries, in 2006.

=== 21st century ===
==== 2000s ====
In the early 2000s, Sagres became a candidate for UNESCO World Heritage status, but in 2003 the Portuguese Commission closed the case and suggested instead that the village be part of a larger geographic project encompassing the entire Costa Vicentina.

Archaeological surveys were carried out in 2005, as part of the Project of the Outer Spaces of the Fortress of Sagres aimed at identifying the original configuration of the portal and its architectural evolution, the drawbridge and the ancient entrances of the fortress. The size and shape of the moat were discovered. In November 2005, the buildings inside the fortress were damaged by a storm and the monument was partially closed to the public. In December 2006, the Minister of Culture, Isabel Pires de Lima, published the list of 21 national monuments that would participate in the competition for the Seven Wonders of Portugal, including the Fortress of Sagres. The President of Tourism of the Algarve Region, Hélder Martins, criticized at the time the advanced level of degradation in which the fortress was in, due to its importance both regionally and nationally as the most visited monument in the Algarve and the third in Portugal, after the Sanctuary of Fátima and the Jerónimos Monastery. Ordinance 1130/2007, dated November 29, 2007, entrusted operations at the fortress by the Algarve Regional Directorate of Culture. At the time, work had not yet been done on the buildings damaged in 2005, with the Fairgrounds in a state of disrepair, and the masonry was already in need of restoration. The situation was criticized by the mayor of Vila do Bispo, Gilberto Viegas, who said he had been asking for years to leave part of the monument's income to local authorities. That year, the president of the Algarve's Regional Coordination and Development Commission, João Faria, spoke about the fortress during the Algarve Congress, arguing that ticket revenues (1.5-2 million euros/year) should be handed over to a body for their administration in order to improve its sustainability. In December, Minister Pires de Lima and Economy Minister Manuel Pinho set 2008 as the start of restoration of the fortress, initially set only for the Exhibition Center to be transformed into a multimedia space. In 2008, archaeological monitoring work was carried out, following the restoration of the access tunnel and the central turf, to identify the changes made to the two elements throughout their history. Between 2009 and 2010, there was the first phase of the Project of Requalification and Valorization of the Promontory of Sagres, part of the National Strategic Framework of Tourism Intervention of the Portuguese Tourism Board, Regional Coordination and Commission for the Development of the Algarve and Regional Directorate for Culture of the Algarve: more than 3 million euros of landscaping works, conservative maintenance of the fortress and its reorganization, geophysical studies on the "Wind Rose," installation of a two-kilometer walkway for users with reduced mobility, reclassification of buildings built in the 1990s, etc.

==== 2010s and 2020s ====
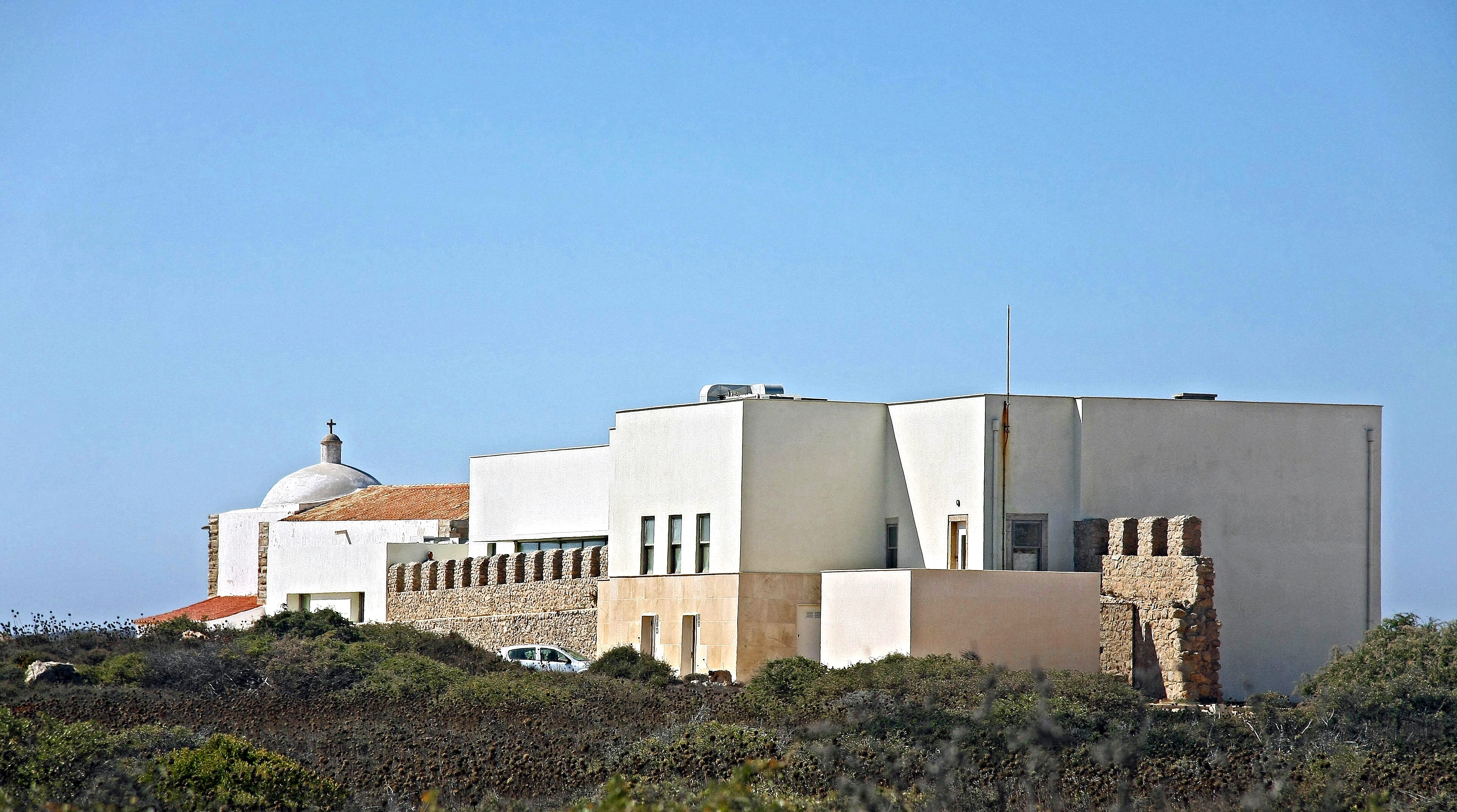
Contemporary buildings inside the fortress, with the Church of Nossa Senhora da Graça in the background.

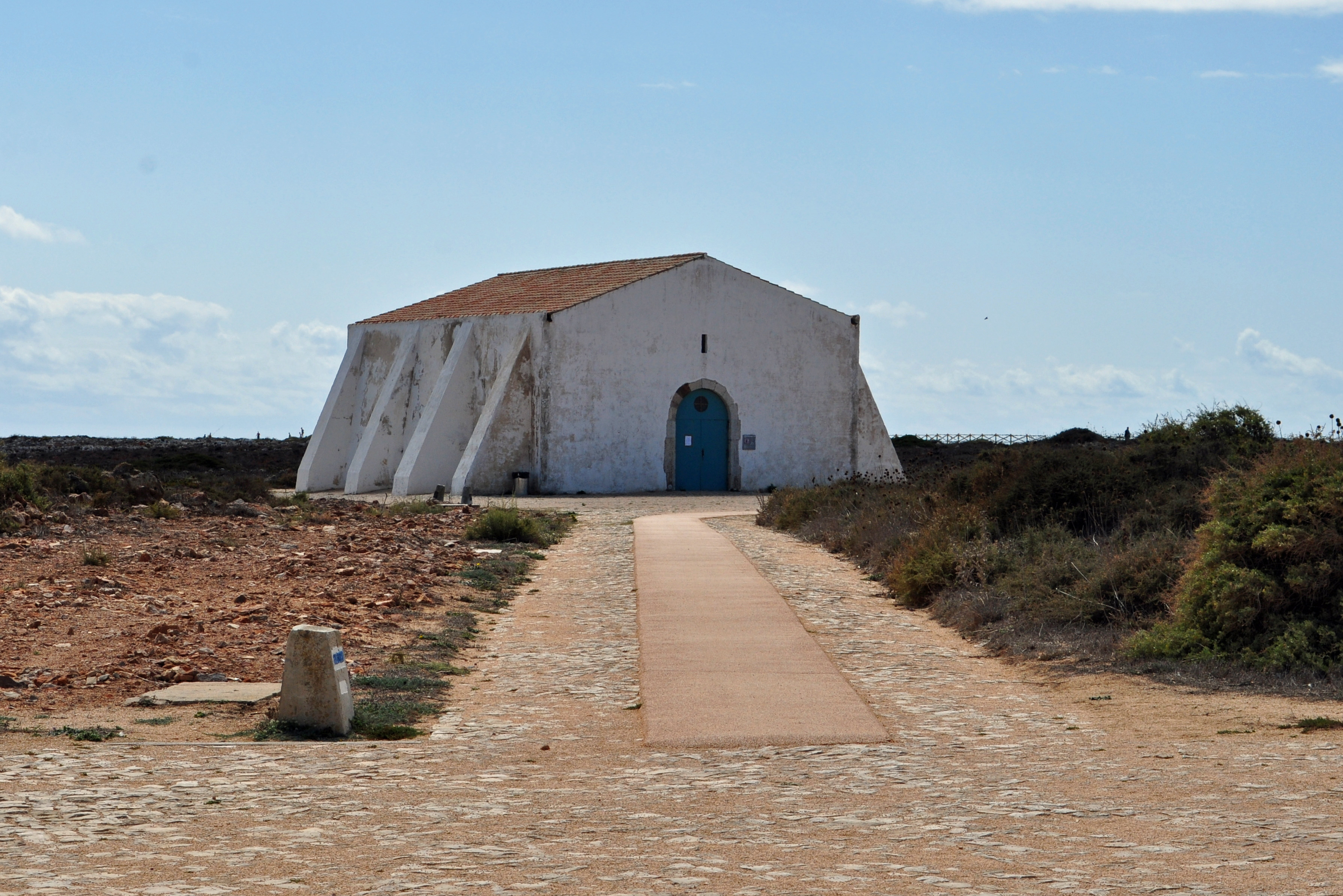
Former ammunition and supply warehouse used as an auditorium.

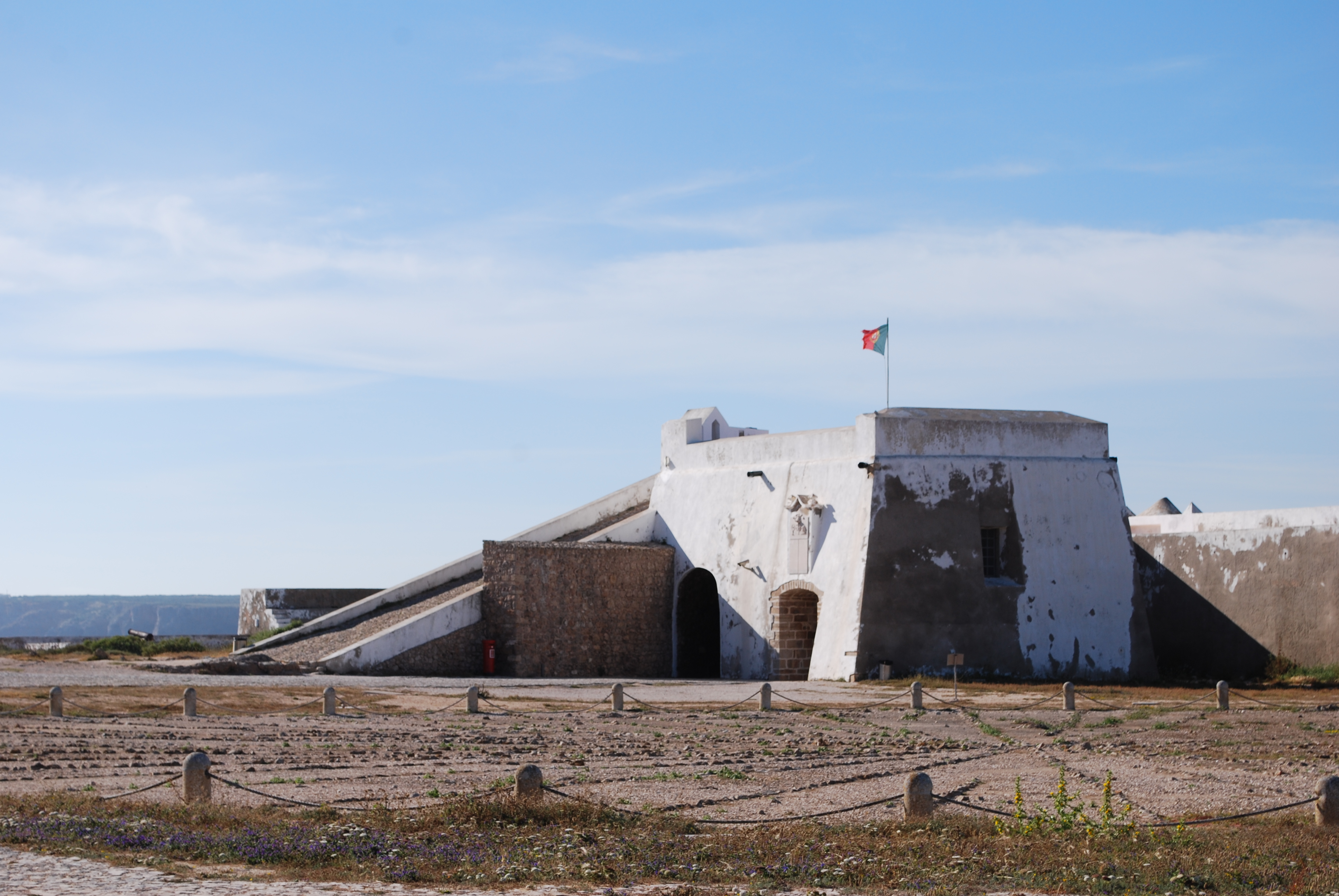
Central turret of the fortress in 2010.

Between April and May 2012, the Fortress of Sagres Fairgrounds project was unveiled, with a budget of about 1.3 million euros, part of the site's redevelopment program with completion scheduled for 2014, to be installed in one of the buildings constructed in the 1990s, the so-called "cod warehouse." The Secretary of State for Culture, Francisco José Viegas, declared that this would be the most significant element of the second phase of the redevelopment program, a strategic intervention for the country but lacking in funds yet to be released. In November 2013, the Algarve's Regional Directorate of Culture informed that renovation work on the auditorium would begin by the company Planirest Construções Lda. In January 2014, the municipality of Vila do Bispo included in its budget for that year the installation of a trailer park near the Fortress of Sagres in order to improve security and parking organization in the fortress access area. In May of the same year, the contract for the rehabilitation of the walls and the execution of the scenic lighting of the fortress was awarded for 635 thousand euros, with completion deadline at the end of the year. In 2015, the monument received the distinction of European Heritage Label, an initiative of the European Parliament and the Council of the European Union to enhance each country's cultural heritage and improve intercultural relations and sense of belonging to the European Community. That year, the American magazine Condé Nast Publications named the Fortress of Sagres one of fifty places to visit in Europe before one dies.

In January 2017, the monument was closed for repair of damage from adverse weather conditions. In February, an application from the Algarve Regional Directorate of Culture was authorized to intervene in Sagres, under the CRESC Algarve 2020 Operational Program, and install the Multimedia Exhibition Center of Portuguese Discoveries. In May, MP Paulo Sá and other members of the Portuguese Communist Party visited the Fortress of Sagres, met with the monument's coordinator, and questioned the Ministry of Cultural Heritage and Activities about the restoration and enhancement of the fortress. The Ministry responded that the contract for the redevelopment of Body A, intended for the Portuguese Multimedia Discovery Exhibition Center, was underway, with work scheduled to be completed in August of that year, and the center opened in 2018. Also in May, the Nova Escola de Sagres program of the Algarve Regional Directorate of Culture and Centro Ciência Viva de Lagos was launched, which included various historical and scientific events, such as the construction of a 6-m modular caravel. In November, Algarve Regional Director of Culture Alexandra Gonçalves confirmed that the center would be completed by the end of 2018, with a budget of about 2 million euros. The building was to be divided into several rooms, including a space for a permanent exhibition, another on the second floor for temporary exhibitions, a store, and a bar-restaurant. The permanent exhibition was divided into six thematic cells: life aboard a caravel, Infante Henry's workroom, a demonstration of how Portuguese is spoken on different continents, etc.

In June 2018, the Algarve Regional Director of Culture announced that the revised specifications for the multimedia center in the Fortress of Sagres were almost complete. In December, the fortress was awarded the distinction of International Place of Culture and Peace, by the International Observatory of Human Rights, as part of the formation of a global cordon of solidarity and the commemorations of the 70th anniversary of the Universal Declaration of Human Rights and 40 years of Portugal's accession to the European Convention on Human Rights.

In February 2019, a program evocative of the 1969 earthquake was organized in Sagres and Lagos, the inaugural session of which was held in the Fortress of Sagres, in the presence of the president of the republic, Marcelo Rebelo de Sousa. In April of that year, the Communist Party criticized the delays in the work of Body A and the fact that the process to establish the center had not yet begun, linking these delays to the government's budget restrictions. In May of that year, the municipality of Vila do Bispo launched the cell phone application Bishop Go, with information on various points of interest in the municipality, including the Fortress of Sagres. In October, the art exhibition Peregrinação II - Codices for Travelers, based on the Codex Casanatense, a 16th-century travel book, was organized at the Fortress of Sagres. On November 12, a Eucharist was celebrated in the Church of Nossa Senhora da Graça in honor of the 500th anniversary of the creation of the parish of Sagres, and a plaque commemorating this event was unveiled.

In January 2020, the Portuguese Environment Agency announced that it would spend about 27 million euros on work to defend monuments from the effects of climate change, including the Fortress of Sagres, where the cliff next to the western bastion was to be stabilized. On March 15 of that year, the Fortress of Sagres was one of the Algarve's monuments temporarily closed as part of the COVID-19 pandemic.

=== Visitor information ===
The fortress is open daily from 9:30 to 17:30 (October–April) and 9:30 to 20:00 (May–September), with last admission 30 minutes before closing. It is closed on 1 January, Easter Sunday, 1 May and 25 December.

As of January 2025, the adult entrance fee is €10, following a nationwide price revision of state-managed monuments approved by the Portuguese Secretary of State for Culture. The previous fee had been €3. Reduced rates (€5) apply for visitors aged 13–24, seniors over 65, and family groups (minimum two members, at least one adult and one child). Children under 12 enter free of charge. Portuguese residents benefit from free admission on 52 designated days per year.

Tickets can be purchased at the gate or in advance through the official online platform of Museus e Monumentos de Portugal.

Visitors may bring pets into the fortress grounds provided they are kept on a lead at all times. Pets are allowed in outdoor areas only and are not permitted inside the exhibition centre.

== See also ==
- Sagres

== Bibliography ==
- "Sagres" (PDF). O Panorama II serie (in Portuguese). 71: 137–144. 1843.
- Almeida PV de (2002). Araújo A (ed.). A arquitectura no Estado Novo: uma leitura crítica: os concursos de Sagres (in Portuguese). Livros Horizonte.
- Alves F (2009). Magalhãaes N; Parreira R (eds.). Sagres: do mar e do tempo (in Portuguese) (1.ª ed.). Direcção Regional de Cultura do Algarve.
- Capelo RG; Monteiro AJ; Nunes JP (1994). Rodrigues AS (ed.). História de Portugal em Datas (in Portuguese). Círculo de Leitores.
- Costa PO de (2009). Henrique, o Infante (in Portuguese) (1.ª ed.). A Esfera dos Livros.
- Gomes MV (1987). Levantamento arqueológico do Algarve: concelho de Vila do Bispo (in Portuguese). Secretaria de Estado da Cultura.
- Magalhãaes N (2008). Algarve Castelos, Cercas e Fortalezas (in Portuguese). Letras Várias.
- Martins JA de Jesus (2000). A freguesia da Vila de Sagres: estudo histórico monográfico (in Portuguese) (1.ª ed.). Junta de Freguesia de Sagres.
- Santos RM (2014). Rodrigues F (ed.). Promontório de Sagres: altar do mundo moderno: três ciclos históricos (in Portuguese) (1.ª ed.). Terramar.
- Silva PFT da (2014). "O Restauro da Fortaleza de Sagres no Estado Novo". Vox Musei: Arte e Património (in Portuguese). 2. Universidade de Lisboa.
- Silva SR (2007). Fortaleza de Sagres (in Portuguese). Tugaland.
