= International Observatory of Human Rights =

Non-governmental organization

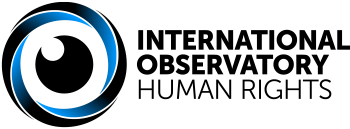
- Founded: November 2017; 8 years ago
- Type: Non-profit; INGO
- Headquarters: London, United Kingdom
- Fields: Press freedom, Refugee Advocacy campaigns, research, advocacy, web TV
- Key people: Valerie Peay (Director)
- Website: observatoryihr.org

The International Observatory of Human Rights (also known as IOHR) is a London-based non-governmental organization focused on exposing human rights violations. It runs a TV channel dedicated to human rights campaigns, the first of its kind, via the netgem.tv interactive platform.

== Profile ==
Established in November 2017, IOHR has focused on a number of themes relating to prisoners of conscience, arbitrary detentions, the refugee crisis, the challenges of extremism and radicalism, social injustice, and violations of international law. It has also been active on the subject of media freedoms and minority rights. It is a nonprofit organization based in the United Kingdom.

The IOHR was founded by Valerie Peay, who also serves as its director. Peay is also a Trustee Director of the Royal Caledonian Educational Trust in Scotland.

== Recent campaigns ==
=== #BeARefugeeSponsor ===
IOHR launched the #BeARefugeeSponsor campaign to call for the expansion of the UK Community Sponsorship of the Syrian Refugees scheme. In August 2018, IOHR held a third event in its #BeARefugeeSponsor series with the aunt of Alan Kurdi, highlighting the benefits of Community Sponsorship and the Canadian experience. Matthew Ryder, London's Deputy Mayor for Social Integration, Social Mobility and Community Engagement lent his support to their appeal.

=== #NotBornARadical ===
IOHR launched the "Not Born A Radical" campaign to address causes of radicalisation and provide progressive platform for educating and empowering the youth, and engaging returning fighters, prisoners and family members. It has hosted events at King's College London and the University of Rostock.

=== #FreeRouhaniHostages ===
IOHR has sought to highlight the case of a growing number of dual citizens who have been incarcerated on return visits to their native Iran. In June 2018 IOHR partnered with the Vrije Universiteit Brussel in inviting Mrs. Vida Mehrannia, the wife of imprisoned Iranian-Swedish professor Dr Ahmad Reza Jalali, to Brussels and Strasbourg to appeal for an urgent intervention from diplomats and members of the European Parliament and the Parliamentary Assembly of the Council of Europe the week before President Hassan Rouhani's visit to Europe.

== IOHR TV ==
IOHR launched IOHR TV, a video content channel, in January 2019 to optimise its campaigning activities. It also broadcasts stories on the IOHR website. The format of video material often comprises one-on-one interviews with guests to discuss topical issues. Output also includes content from IOHR events.
