= Fort São Vicente (Sagres) =

Bastion fort in Portugal

- Fortaleza de São Vicente
- Sagres, Portugal
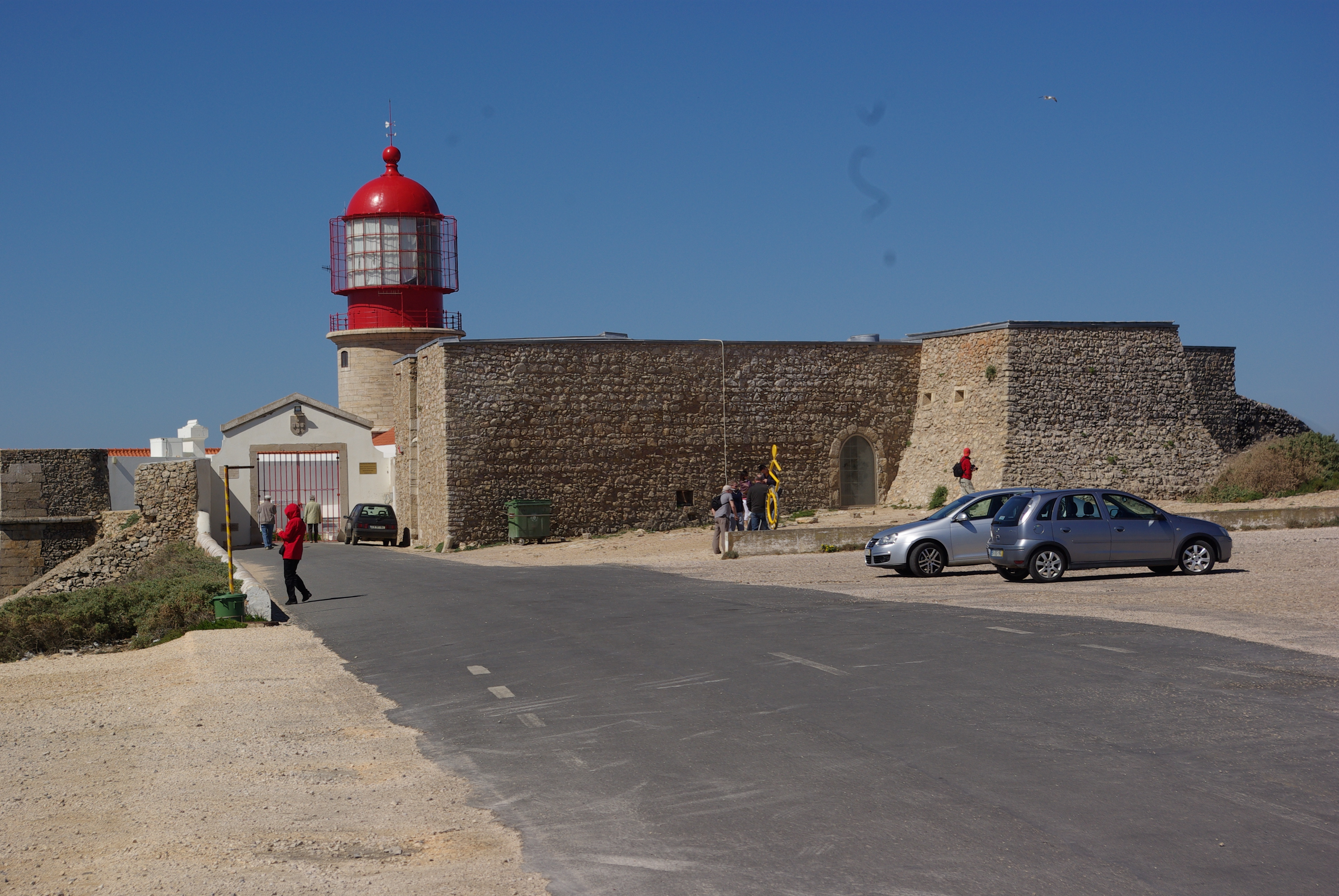

Site information
- Type: Bastion fort

Location
- Coordinates: 37°1′23″N 8°59′46″W

Fort São Vicente (Fortaleza de São Vicente in Portuguese) is a military monument in Sagres, in the Algarve region of Portugal. It consists of the remains of a fortification, with a lighthouse inside. It was built in the 16th century to protect a coastal strip and an existing monastery on the site. In 1587 it was destroyed by British privateer Francis Drake, and rebuilt in 1606. In the mid-19th century, a lighthouse was built on the site, which was replaced by a new one in the early 20th century. In the mid-2000s, Cape São Vicente was closed to the public for construction work.

== Description ==
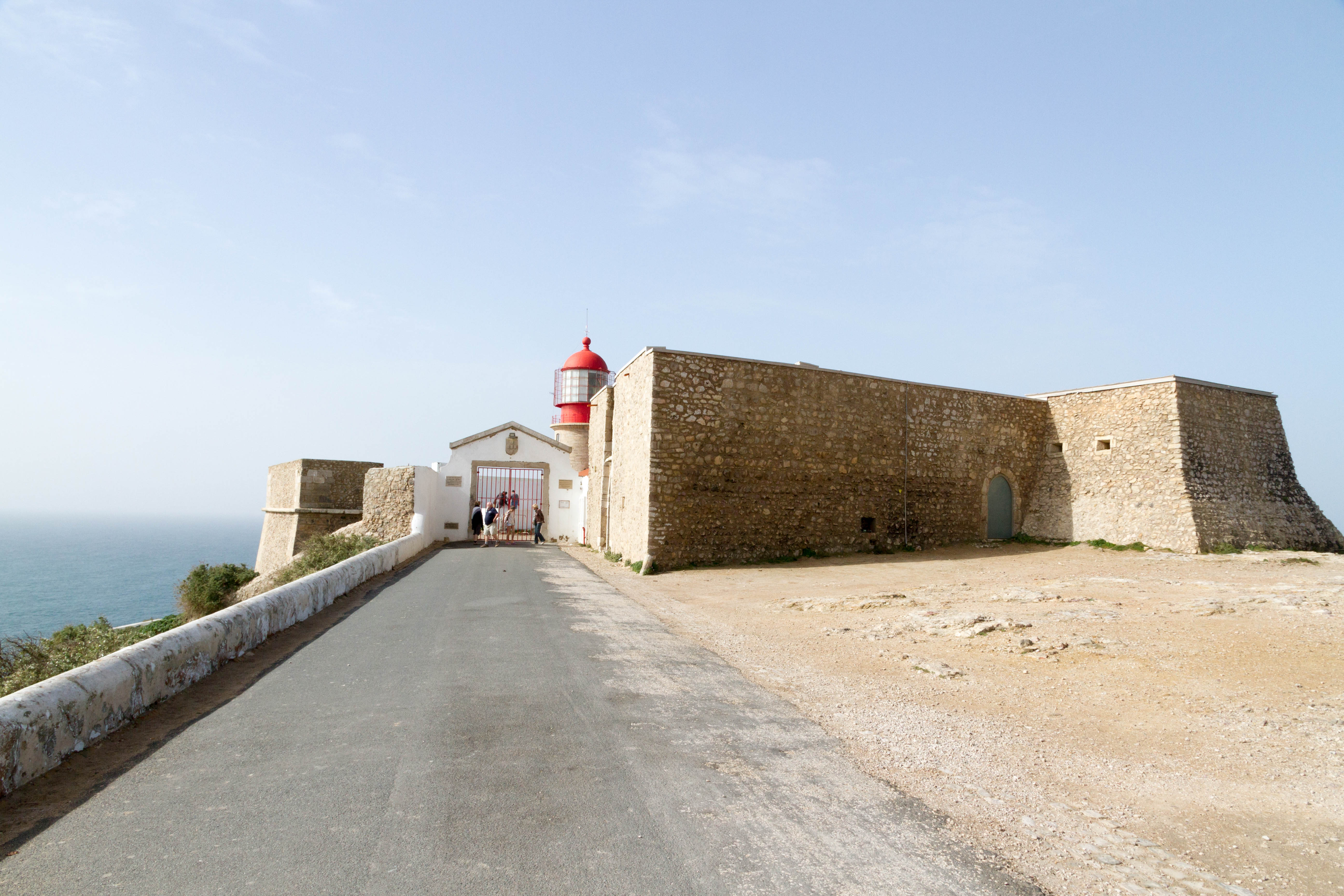
Front view of the fort

The fortress is located on Cape St. Vicent, the most southwestern point of the Portuguese coast, once considered vital for Algarve. It has a polygon plan, with a bulwark on the façade facing the land, and two entrances to the fort, a main one on the wall, and a smaller one that opens laterally. The main door has a perfect arch and is topped by the Portuguese coat of arms. It originally had a drawbridge. Inside, some features belonging to the fortress can still be seen, such as barrel vaults and terraces.

In turn, the monasteries former facilities were replaced by buildings to support the lighthouse. However, inside the complex there is an open space, protected by eight-sided walls, which could be the former cloister. There are also traces of some cisterns The buildings of the fortress showed Mannerist architecture. Next to the entrance is a tombstone commemorating the construction of the lighthouse in 1846.

Inside the fortress is the São Vicente Lighthouse, which is considered one of the longest-ranged in Europe, with a glow that can be visible from about 43 kilometers far, and also equipped with an audible signal.

== History ==
=== Background ===
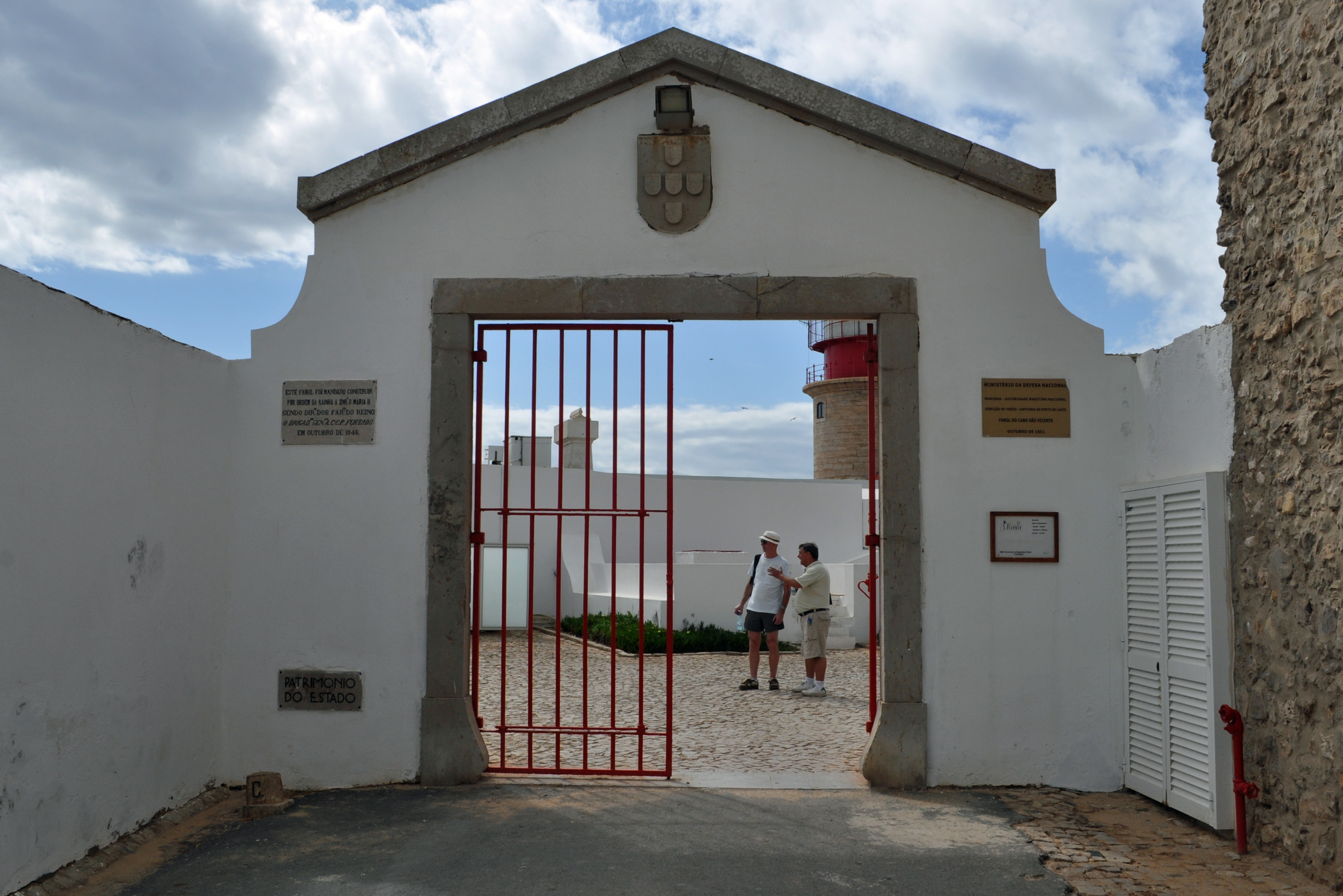
Gate-of-arms

Human occupation in Cabo de São Vicente dates back to prehistory, and lithic materials of the Musterian and Mirense typology were collected at the site, chronologically integrated in the Paleolithic and Mesolithic periods, polished stone pieces from the Neolithic, and a skewer in Iron Age bronze. Several classical authors, such as Ephorus, Artemidorus and Strabo, mention, probably based on the Massaliot Periplus, that there were monoliths of religious function in the cape, which were surrounded by visitors, and then used in libations. In 1639 a burial tomb was discovered at the west end of the cape, with an epigraphed tombstone, which probably dates back to the Roman period.

The headland became a Christian pilgrimage site, as it is the site of the legendary tomb of Saint Vincent, who was martyred by the Romans in the 4th century. The sixteenth-century historian Duarte Nunes de Leão, in his work Description of the Kingdom of Portugal, mentions that the mortal remains of the saint were transported by boat together with a group of Christians, who had fled from Valencia due to the persecutions of the Moors, having always been followed by a crow. According to legend, the boat reached the cape, and the Christians built a small hermitage there to keep the saint's body, and some houses for his habitation, which continued to be occupied by his descendants. The Arab geographer Al Idrissi mentioned that there was the Temple of the Crow, on whose roof ten birds lived, which never left that place. The temple in which the saint's tomb was allegedly located was demolished by Muslim forces in the 12th century. According to tradition, some members of the community were killed, while others were taken captive. Two of these Christians were reportedly freed by King Afonso Henriques after a battle against the Moorish King Ismar, having informed the monarch that São Vicente was buried at the cape. King Afonso Henriques then went personally to Sagres in search of the saint's remains, but without success. It was not until several years after the Conquest of Lisbon that the Christians were able to return safely to Cabo de São Vicente, the corpse having been unearthed and sent to Lisbon by boat, where it arrived in 1175 or 1176. According to legend, the boat was always accompanied by a crow, which lived for several years in the Cathedral of Lisbon, where the saint was deposited. São Vicente became the patron saint of Lisbon, and the boat and crows became symbols of the city. A tooth would have been transported to Abrantes, which is why several crows are represented in the coat of arms of that locality, as symbols of Saint Vicent.

=== Convent and fortress construction ===
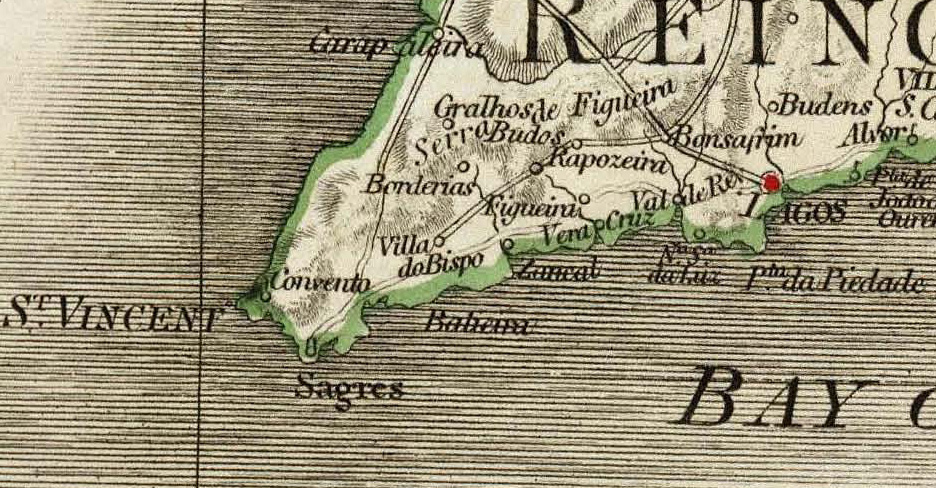
Location at Sagres Cape

Around 1260, King Afonso III determined the construction of a hospital or inn, to be used by pilgrims who were going to visit the tomb of Saint Vicent. Another reason for installing this house would be to maintain a permanent community at this point, which due to its geographical location was constantly under threat from enemies. During the reign of King Denis, between 1279 and 1325, The church complex was expanded, becoming a monastery, known as Corvo Monastery. During the reign of King Fernando, between 1367 and 1383, he granted his main chaplain, Vasco Lourenço, the rents, rights and offerings that belonged to the chapel and hermitage of São Vicente do Cabo. On January 29, 1387, King John I made a similar donation to his main chaplain, Martim Gonçalves. According to tradition, Infante Dom Pedro ordered the construction of a chapel in the place where the saint had been buried.

The main driver of the convent was Dom Fernando Coutinho, Bishop of Silves, who ordered the construction of several houses next to the chapel, where he spent part of the year. He later ordered the installation of a convent there for the monks of the Order of Saint Jerome, who had already been authorized in 1476 to found a house in the Diocese of Silves by Pope Sixtus IV. Dom Fernando Coutinho handed over the convent to the friars on the condition that they would keep a lighthouse in operation in a tower, whose construction he also ordered. This lighthouse had the function of preventing shipwrecks, which happened frequently in that area. Cape Saint Vicent was considered ideal for members of the Order, due to its hermit's origins, they sought out isolated spots and by the ocean. The bishop also made large donations to the monks, which consisted of the so-called Assento de Santo Antonio, composed of a ceiling and exempt located in the Monchique Mountainrange, with vineyards, orchards, olive trees and sowing grounds; a farm in Vila Nova de Portimão, which at the beginning of the 20th century was still known as Quinta do Bispo; the sheds and mills in that county; another farm in Messejana, in the municipality of Ourique; the so-called Casal do Cabo, with land he had acquired from the chapter; a farm in front of the city of Lisbon, and an orchard in Aljezur. These donations were confirmed by King Manuel in a document dated March 5, 1514. The Convent of São Vicente was one of several monastic houses built on the initiative of Dom Fernando Coutinho, including the Convents of São Francisco in Lagos and in the municipality of Silves, and the Convent of Santa Clara in Tavira, among others.

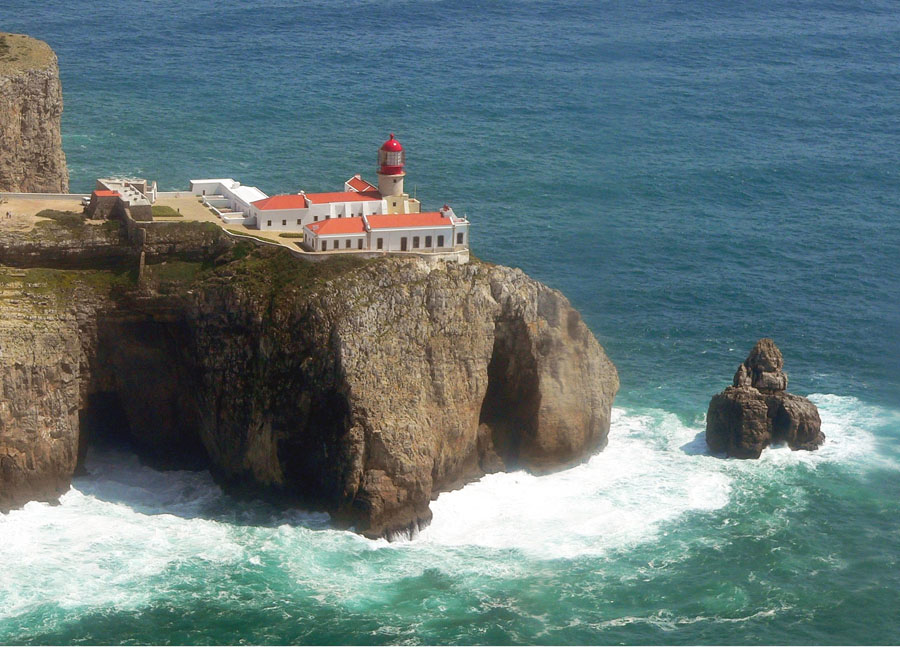
Aerial photograph of the São Vicente fort from the sea.

This was the only house of the Hyeronimite friars in Algarve. However, their occupation of the Convento do Corvo was very brief, with records of their presence only after 1514, and in 1516 they abandoned the premises. Due to its location, the monastery was considered a rural house, being one of the two buildings in the Algarve to have this typology, the other being the Hermitage of Pegos Verdes, located in the mountain area. Thus, Dom Fernando Coutinho invited the Capuchin friars of the Custodia da Piedade to occupy the convent, having guaranteed the same donations and the same obligation to keep the lighthouse in operation. The convent thus passed to the Capuchin friars in 1516. This was the first nucleus of this order in the Algarve, and the fourth in national territory, having been installed in Cape Saint Vicent as part of a process of expansion to the south, which had been born in the Alentejo. This phase of occupation of the convent was part of a period of expansion of the monastic network in the Algarve, which began at the beginning of the 16th century and lasted until the middle of the 17th century, motivated mainly by the growth of the Counter-Reformation, which led to the reorganization and multiplication of religious orders. Also around 1516, Dom Fernando Coutinho ordered the construction of a fortress, to protect the convent and the large number of pilgrims who visited it, and at the same time defend the coast from attacks by Muslim pirates. He also built a wall between the Fortress of Belixe and a point on the coast to the north, known as Armação Nova, thus creating an enclosed space where the convent was located. According to some authors, the first lighthouse operated between 1515 and 1520. On June 21, 1520, D. Fernando Coutinho granted new properties to the convent, with houses and a fence, in order to provide for its sustenance, due to the lack of arable land nearby. Thus, the convent fence was not located in the immediate vicinity, as was normal for this type of building, but on a property located about four kilometers away, in a place later known as Quinta do Vale Santo.

According to the researcher Lívio da Costa Guedes, a document from 1573 mentions that the king was interested in installing a monastery of the Order of Christ on the São Vicente headland, in order to defend the region from the assaults of the Turks and Moors. The fort and convent were destroyed by the British privateer Francis Drake in 1587, as part of an attack on the defenses of the Sagres region, during a military campaign along the coast of the Iberian Peninsula. The religious took refuge in the convents of Lagos and Portimão, and only returned in 1606, the year in which the reconstruction of the fortress was completed, by order of King Philip III of Spain.

=== 18th and 19th centuries ===
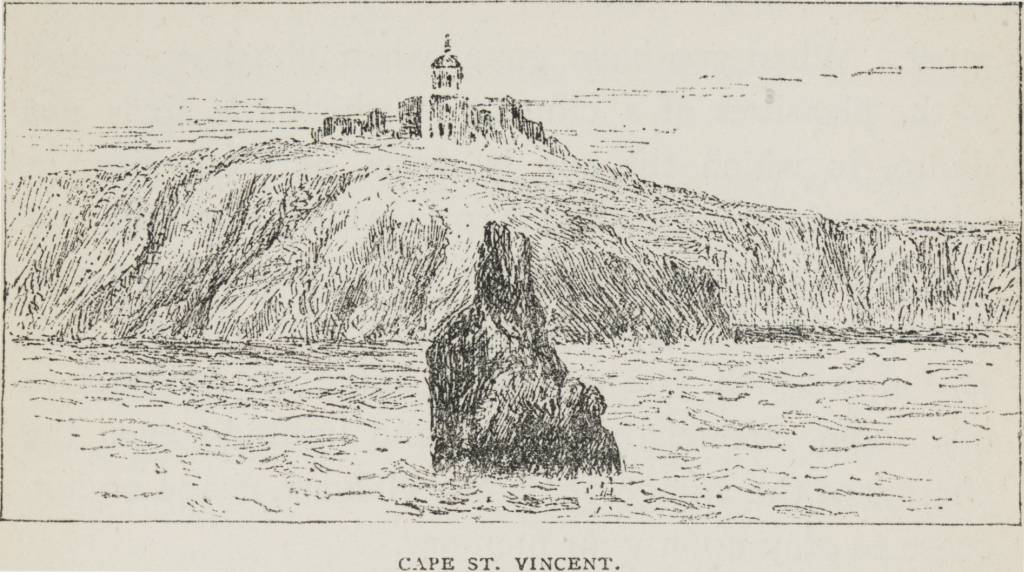
19th century drawing

The complex was later damaged by earthquakes in 1719 and 1722, and was severely damaged by the 1755 earthquake, and the restoration work was ordered by Queen Maria. The convent and church were abandoned following the process of the extinction of religious orders in 1834. Since the destruction of the original lighthouse by Francis Drake's forces, several attempts were made to rebuild it, but the definitive impetus was only given in 1846, when the government of Queen Maria II ordered the construction of a lighthouse on the site. The installation of this structure was part of a phase of great development of the lighthouse network in the national territory, initiated in the 18th century, and inspired by similar measures carried out in other European countries.

=== 20th and 21st centuries ===
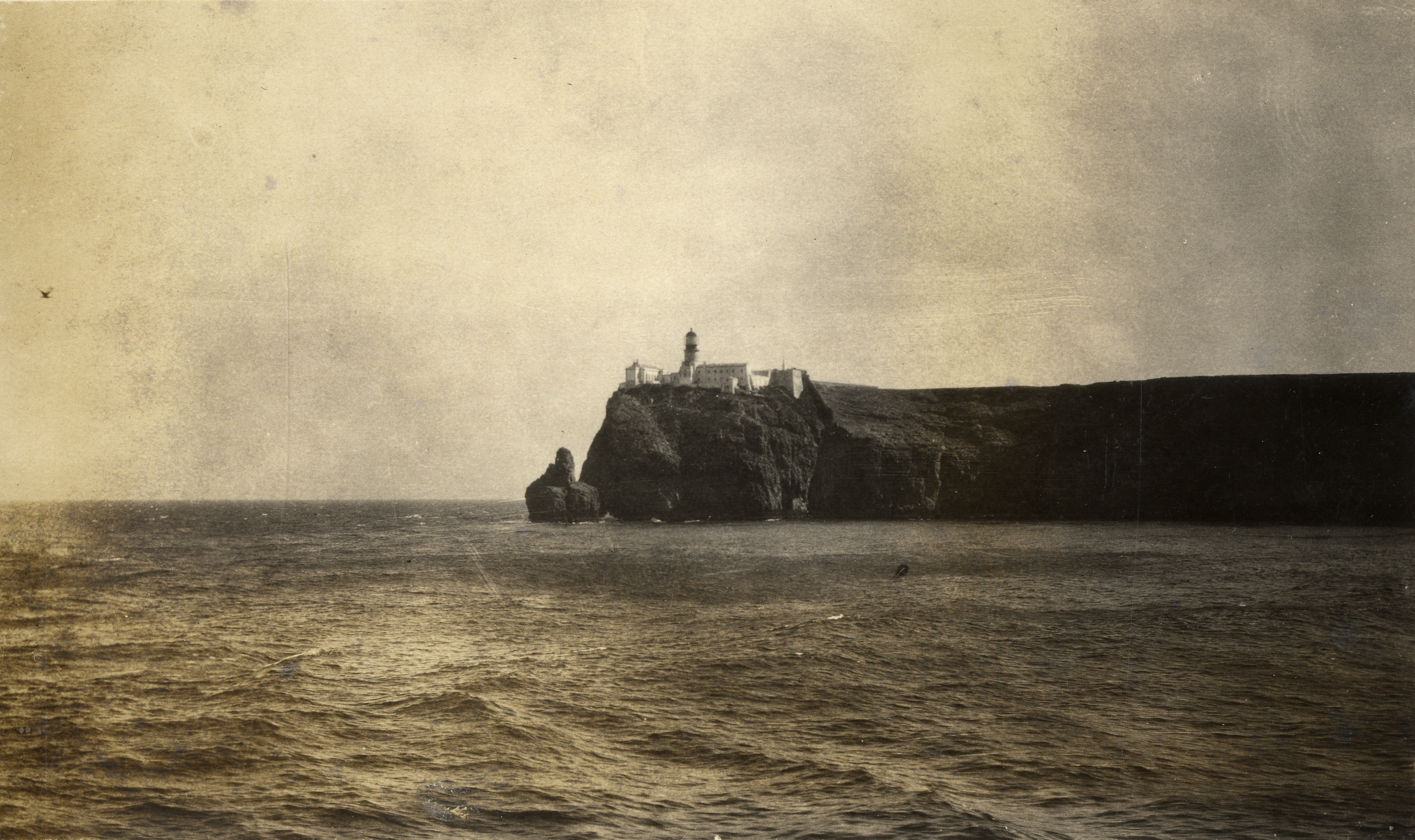
1929 photograph

At the beginning of the 20th century, a new lighthouse was built, leading to the disappearance of the remains of the convent and church, which were replaced by constructions of the Ministry of the Navy, and support for the lighthouse. Of the original complex, only the fortress remained, in an advanced state of degradation. The fortress was classified as a Property of Public Interest by Decree No. 4075, of December 5, 1961. In 1969, it was damaged by an earthquake.

The lighthouse and its supporting structures were closed to the public in mid-2005 for improvement and maintenance works, keeping the original design of the buildings. The works were completed in October 2007, and involved an investment of over half a million Euros. However, due to lack of funds, the work corresponding to the installation of a museum complex in the building known as the casa da Parede, which was located next to the entrance gate of the fortress, was not carried out, which is why the monument remained closed to visitors. In December of that year, the launch of the missing contract was already being prepared, and it was foreseen at that time that the works would start during the first quarter of 2008. The museum would function as an extension of the Navy Museum, and would also have a cafeteria. At the time, the then president of the Algarve Tourism Region, António Pina, classified the Cape of Sagres region as «the jewel in our crown», and predicted that after the end of the restoration works on the fortress, it would be sought by tourists.

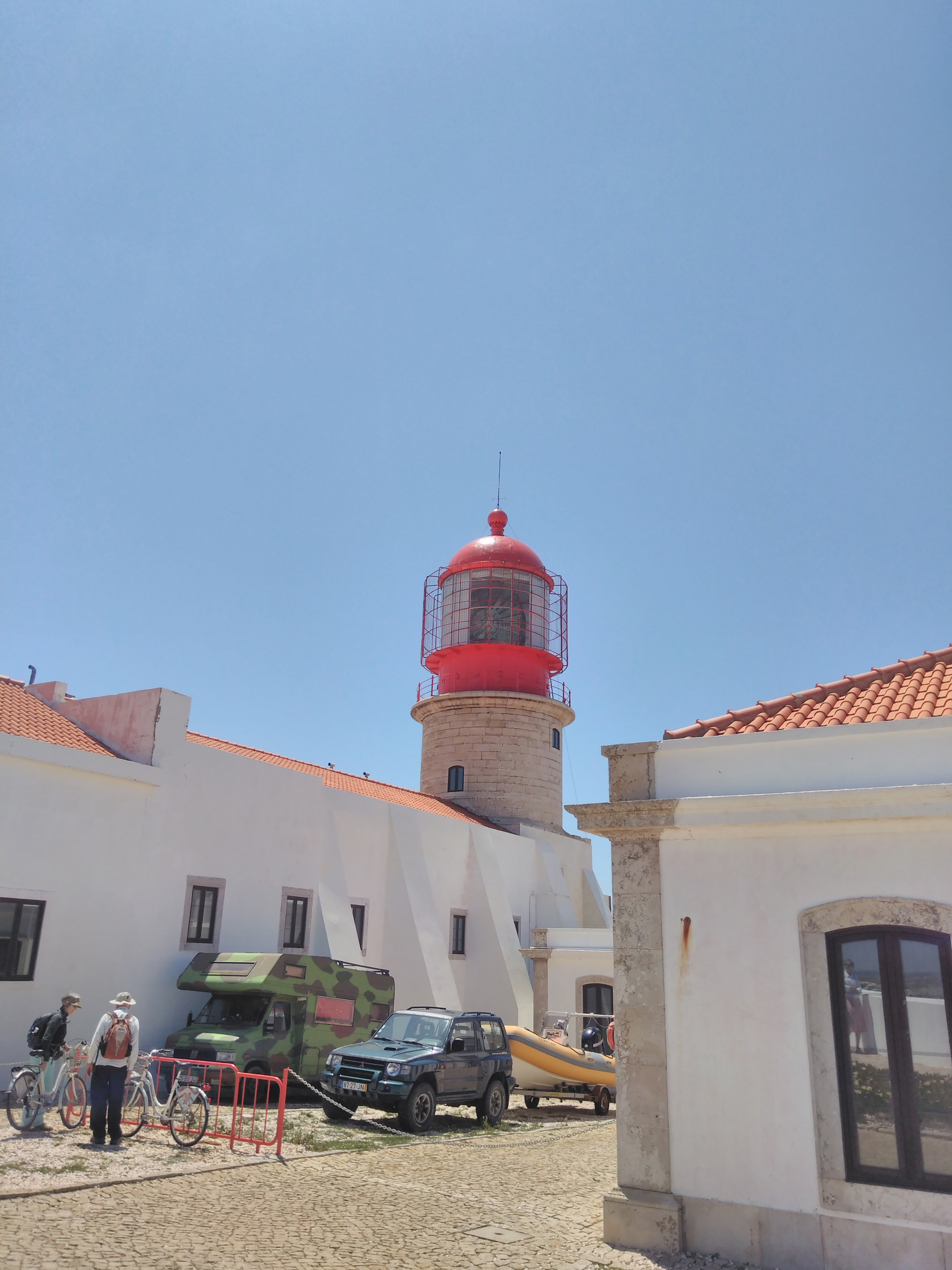
Lighthouse at the Fort

== See also ==
- Fort of Arrifana
- Fort of Santo António de Belixe
- Fort of Almádena
- Cape St. Vincent
