= List of fishing villages =

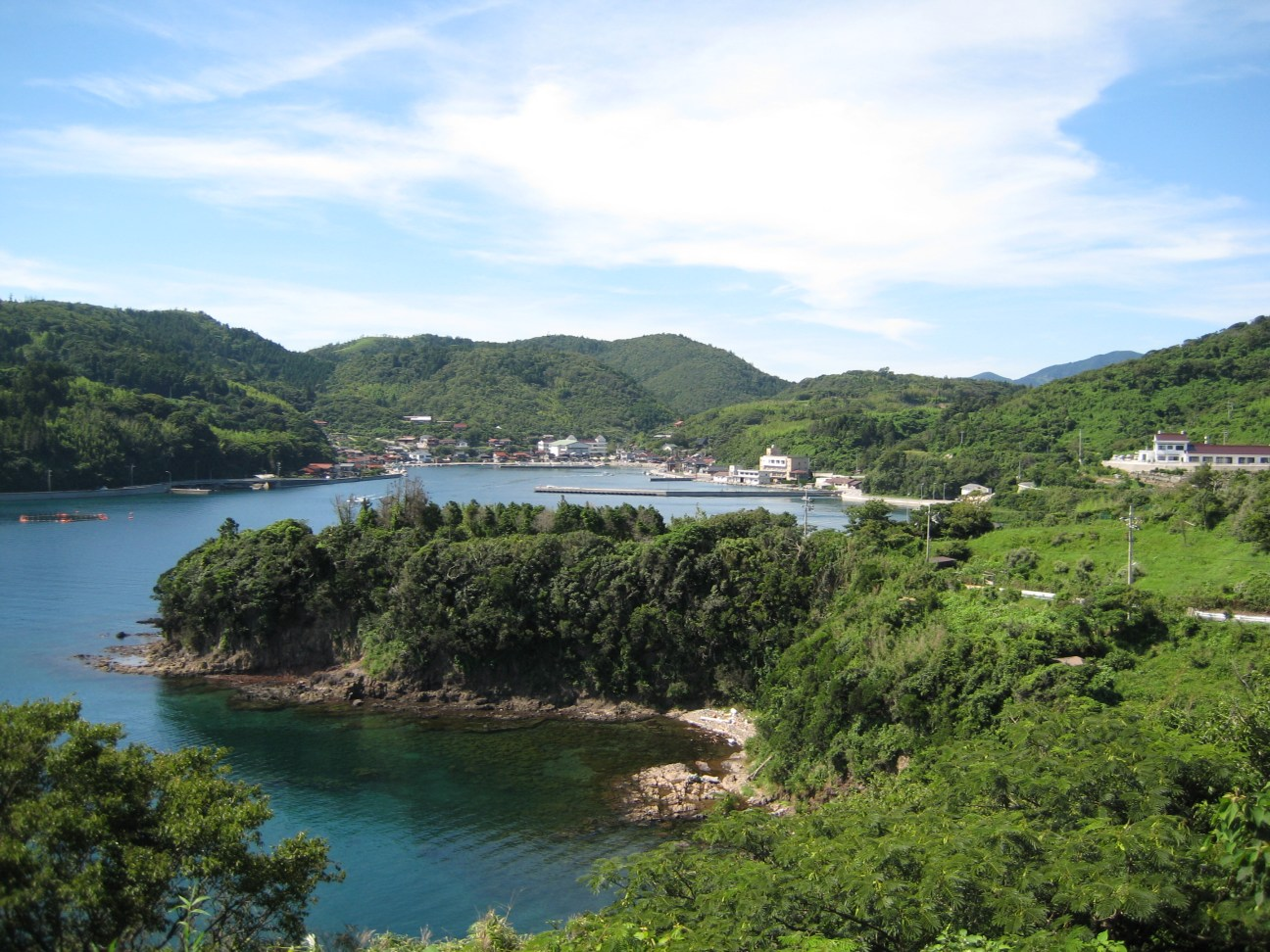
The main populated area of Chibu, Japan

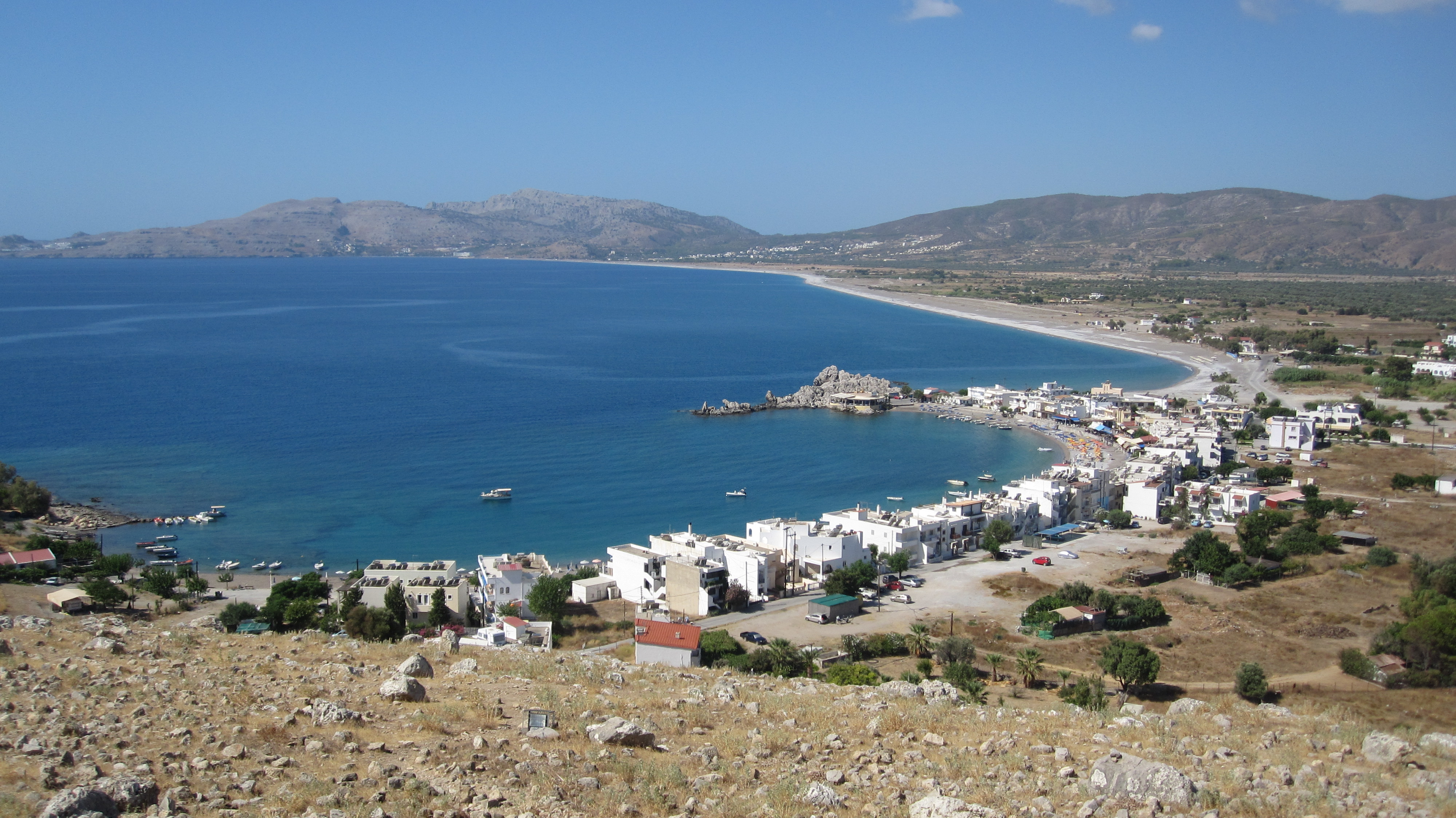
View of the Charaki fishing village in the island of Rhodes, Greece

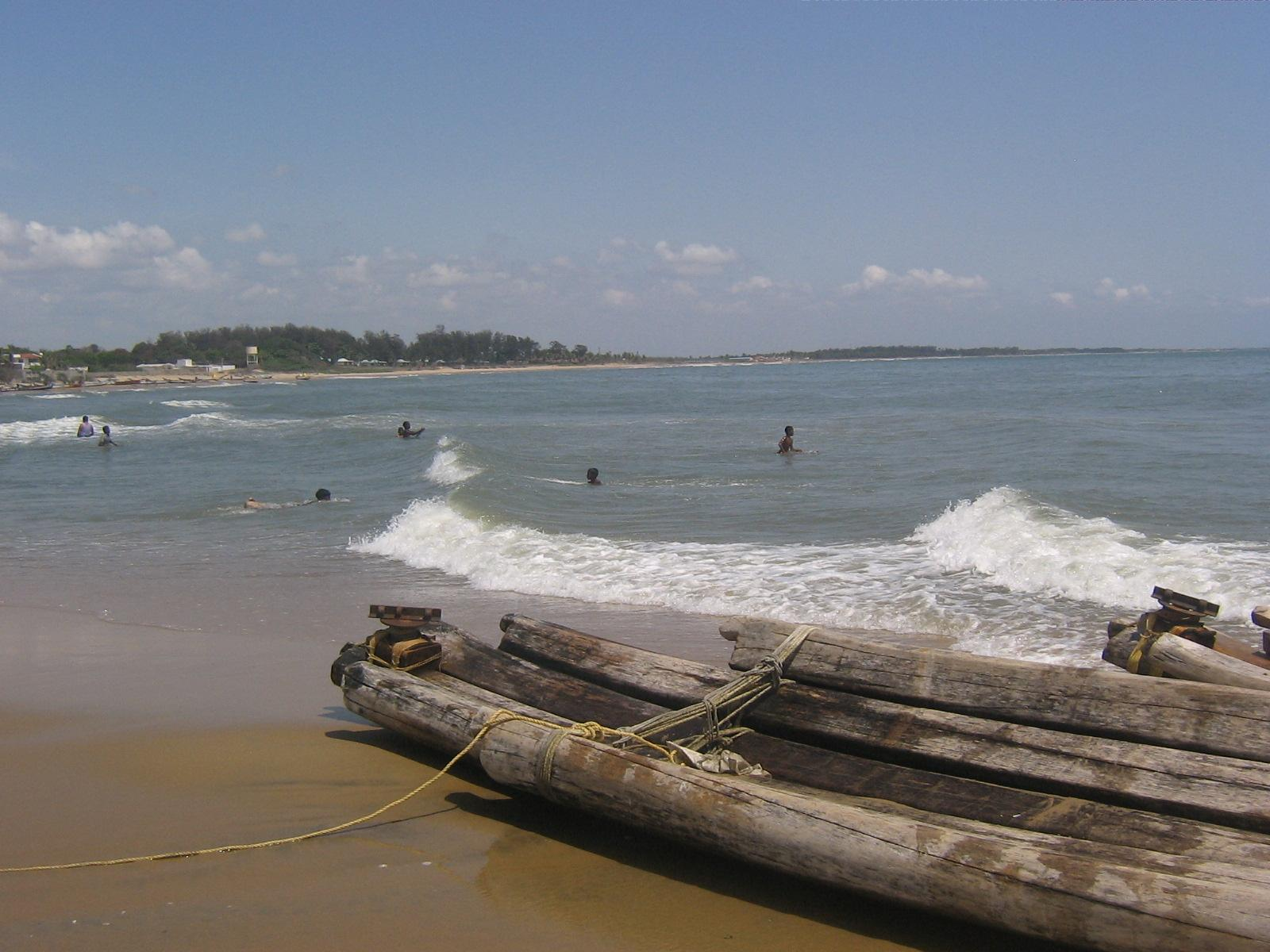
Covelong Beach, India, view from the south

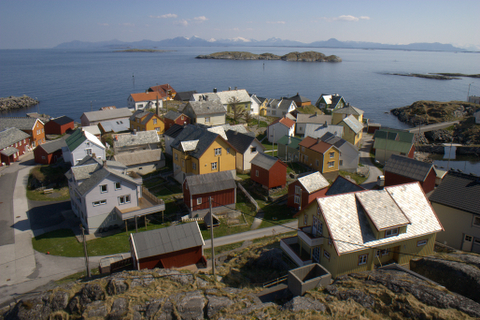
Ona is a traditional fishing village in Norway

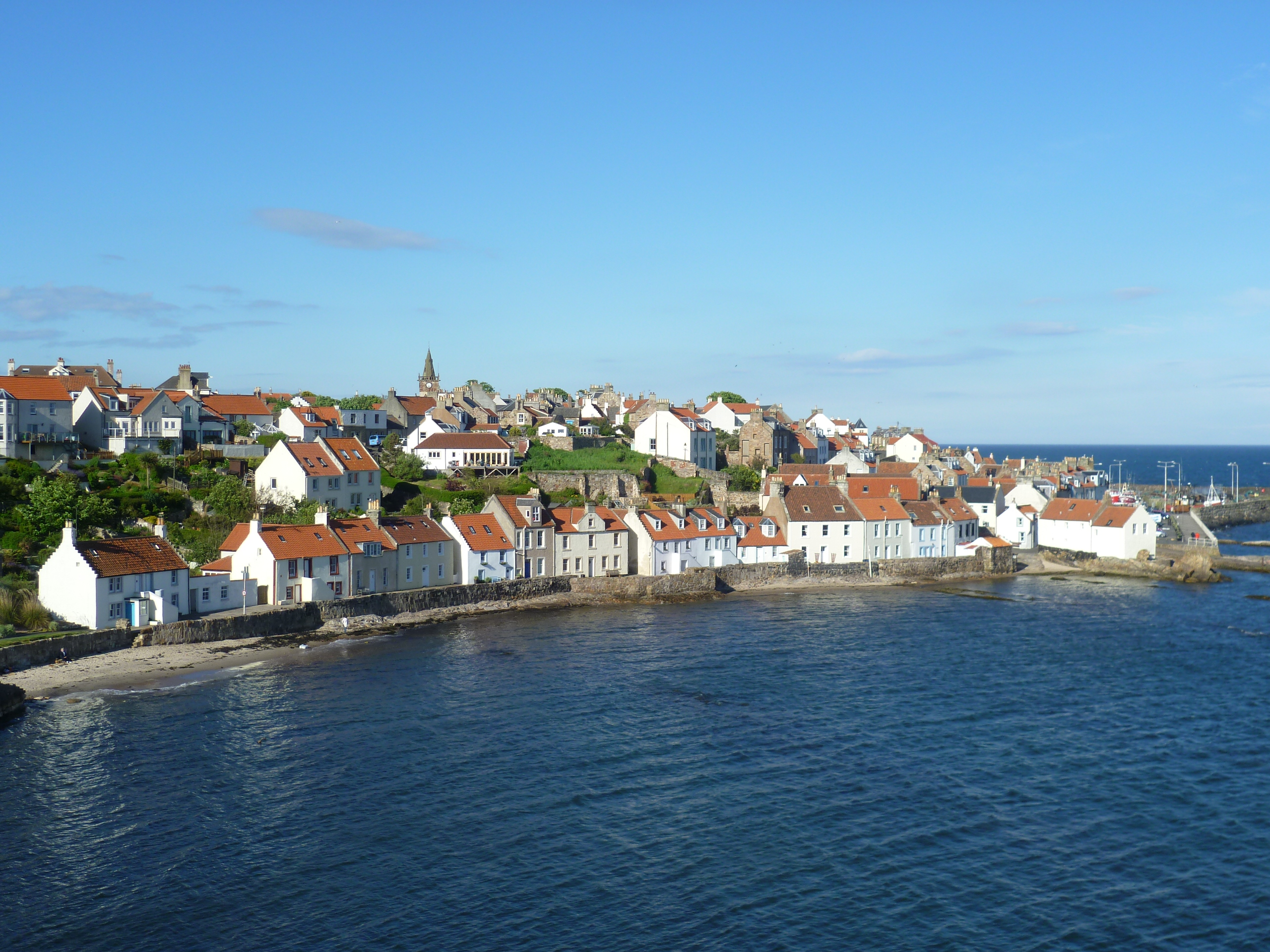
Pittenweem, Fife, Scotland

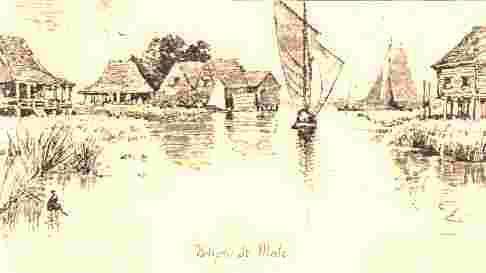
Saint Malo, Louisiana as it appeared in Harper's Weekly in 1883

This is a list of fishing villages. A fishing village is a village, usually located near a fishing ground, with an economy based on catching fish and harvesting seafood.

== Fishing villages ==
- Akwidaa, Ghana
- Amed, Indonesia
- Bethsaida, Israel (historical)
- Capernaum, Israel (historical)
- Chibu, Japan
- Chorkor, Ghana
- Huanchaco, Peru
- Kakapir, Pakistan
- Marsaxlokk, Malta
- Myliddy, Sri Lanka
- Ninh Thủy, Vietnam
- Reposaari, Finland
- Salehabad, Pakistan
- Sayulita, Nayarit, Mexico
- Smygehuk, Sweden
- Sucuriju, Brazil
- Taganga, Colombia
- Taghazout, Morocco
- Udappu, Sri Lanka
- Volendam, Netherlands
- Walraversijde, Belgium

=== Canada ===
- Ladner, British Columbia
- Old Perlican, Newfoundland and Labrador
- Overton, Nova Scotia
- Peggys Cove, Nova Scotia
- Red Bay, Newfoundland and Labrador
- St. Laurent, Manitoba
- Steveston, British Columbia
- Tilting, Newfoundland and Labrador

=== China ===
- Po Toi O, Hong Kong
- Tai O, Hong Kong
- Yanglingang, Jiangsu

=== Denmark ===
- Snogebæk
- Sørvágur, Faroe Islands
- Thyborøn
- Vorupør

=== Estonia ===
- Altja
- Käsmu
- Prangli

=== France ===
- Barfleur, Manche
- Ciboure, Nouvelle-Aquitaine
- Douarnenez, Finistère
- Granville, Manche, Manche
- Le Guilvinec, Finistère
- Ile-de-Sein, Finistère
- Paimpol, Côtes-d'Armor
- Saint-Jean-de-Luz, Nouvelle-Aquitaine

=== Greece ===
- Agios Nikolaos
- Alykes
- Charaki
- Kassiopi
- Sigri

=== Iceland ===
- Bolungarvík
- Hjalteyri
- Stokkseyri
- Súðavík
- Suðureyri

=== India ===
- Puthenthope, Kerala
- Covelong, Tamil Nadu
- Eraviputhenthurai, Tamil Nadu

=== Ireland ===
- An Rinn
- Dunmore East
- Easky

=== Italy ===
- Portofino, Liguria
- Vernazza, Liguria

=== Malta ===
- Marsaskala
- Marsalforn
- Marsaxlokk
- Bugibba

=== Norway ===
- Grip
- Hovden
- Kamøyvær
- Moskenes
- Nyksund
- Ona
- Reine

=== Portugal ===
- Alvor
- Aveiro
- Cascais
- Câmara de Lobos
- Carvoeiro
- Nazaré
- Olhos de Água
- Peniche
- Salema

=== South Africa ===
- Amsterdamhoek
- Hondeklip Bay

=== Spain ===
- Bermeo, Basque Country
- Elantxobe, Basque Country
- Getaria, Basque Country
- Hondarribia, Basque Country
- Lekeitio, Basque Country
- Los Nietos, Region of Murcia
- Mutriku, Basque Country
- Ondarroa, Basque Country
- Orio, Basque Country
- Sa Riera, Catalonia
- Santa Pola, Valencian Community
- Zumaia, Basque Country

=== Suriname ===
- Boskamp
- Braamspunt

=== Turkey ===
- Gümüşlük
- Peksimet

=== United Kingdom ===
- Catalan Bay, Gibraltar

==== England ====
- Cadgwith
- Cullercoats
- Lamorna
- Mousehole
- Port Isaac
- Robin Hood's Bay
- Rock

==== Northern Ireland ====
- Ardglass
- Portavogie

==== Scotland ====
- East Haven
- Harrow
- Lochinver
- Newhaven
- Pittenweem
- Portmahomack
- St Abbs

==== Wales ====
- Ferryside

=== United States ===
- Delacroix Island, Louisiana
- Reggio, Louisiana
- Kaunolu, Hawaii (historical)
- Pu'upehe, Hawaii
- Saint Malo, Louisiana (historical)
- Shell Beach, Louisiana
- Villa Pesquera, Puerto Rico
- Wanchese, North Carolina
- Cedar Key, Florida

== See also ==
- Community-supported fishery
- Fishing
- Fishing industry
- Uru people – a pre-Incan people who live on forty-two self-fashioned floating islands in Lake Titicaca Puno, Peru and Bolivia
