= Alykes (disambiguation) =

Alykes (Greek: Αλυκές, "salt pans") may refer to several places in Greece:

- Alykes, a municipality in the island of Zakynthos
- Alykes, Achaea, a village in Achaea
- Alykes, Phthiotis, a village in Phthiotis
- Alykes, Samos, a village on Samos
