= Fort of Almádena =

17th Century fort in Portugal

- Forte de São Luís de Almádena
- Faro District; Near Burgau in Portugal
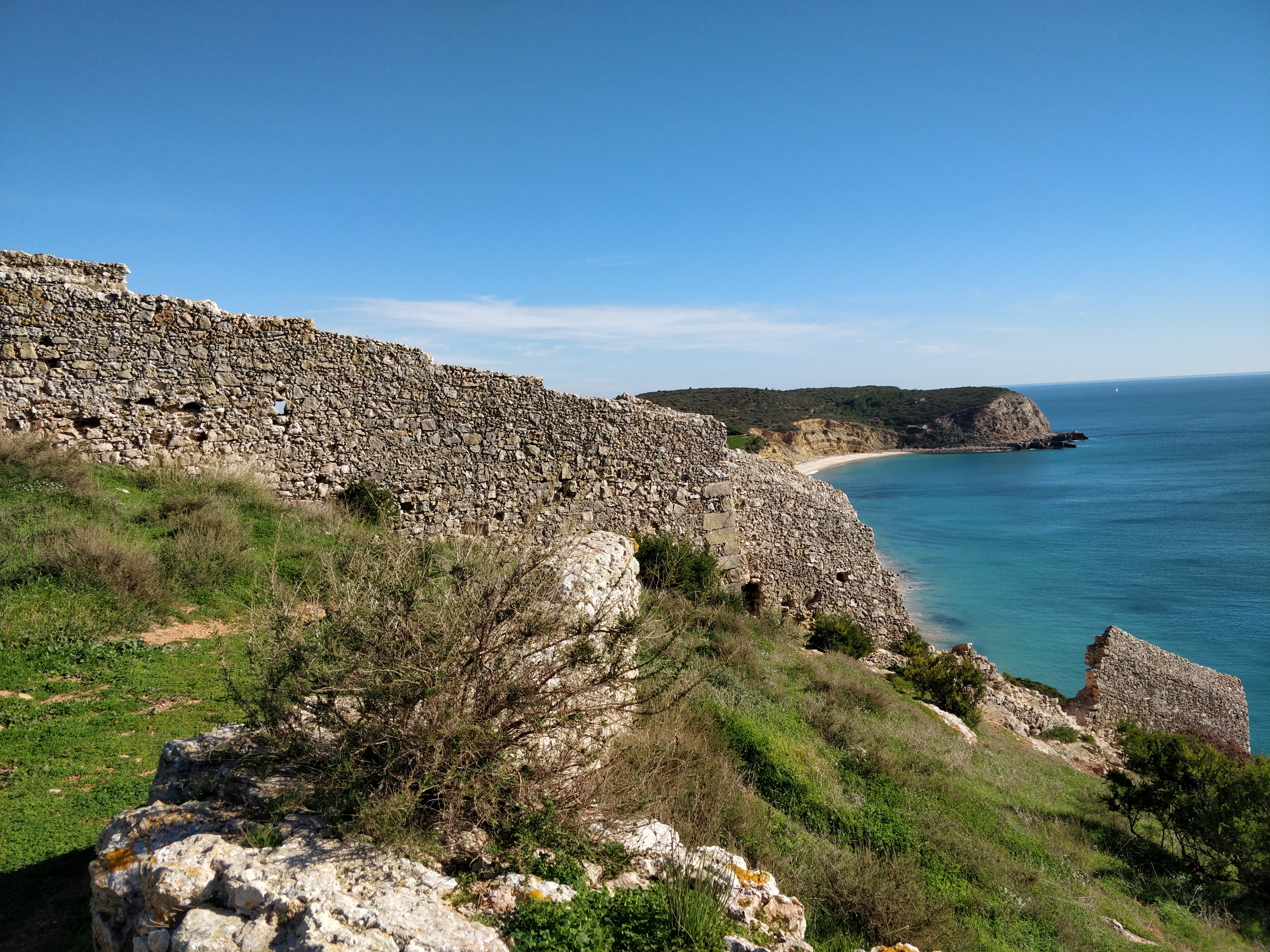
- Side view of the Almádena fort looking east

Site information
- Type: Fort
- Owner: Vila do Bispo municipality
- Open to the public: with caution
- Condition: Partially restored

Location
- Coordinates: 37°04′00″N 8°48′15″W

The Fort of Almádena (Portuguese: Forte de Almádena) or (Portuguese: Forte de São Luís de Almádena), also known as the Fort of the River Mouth (Portuguese: Forte da Boca do Rio), is located between the towns of Salema and Burgau, in the Algarve region of Portugal. It was constructed in 1632. Damaged by the 1755 earthquake, it was abandoned in 1849.

== History ==
The need for a fort at Almádena was identified during the Philippine Dynasty (1581-1640) as being necessary in order to protect the area’s tuna fishery from the attacks of privateers and pirates. Under the reign of Philip III of Portugal (1621-1665), the fort was built on the orders of Luís de Sousa, 2nd Count of Prado, who served as Governor and Captain General of the Kingdom of Algarve and who also paid for the fort’s construction. The fort of Almádena was constructed on a cliff 78 metres above the sea on the ruins of an older fortification, variously believed to be Roman or a Muslim ribat. It followed a polygonal plan and included two ramparts, a moat with a drawbridge, two batteries, and the barracks. There was also a chapel, which doubled as a watchtower. Initially, the fort was manned by fishermen.

In contrast to what happened to other forts in the Algarve, Almádena did not suffer too much damage from the earthquake (and consequent tsunami) of November 1, 1755. In 1759 there was a sea battle between the English and the French nearby. It was manned during the Portuguese Civil War (1828-1834) but, after that conflict, and having lost its military function, it was abandoned. In the middle of the nineteenth century, it was used as shelter by some soldiers of the 15th Infantry Regiment, Lagos, for coastal surveillance, including the control of tobacco smuggling.

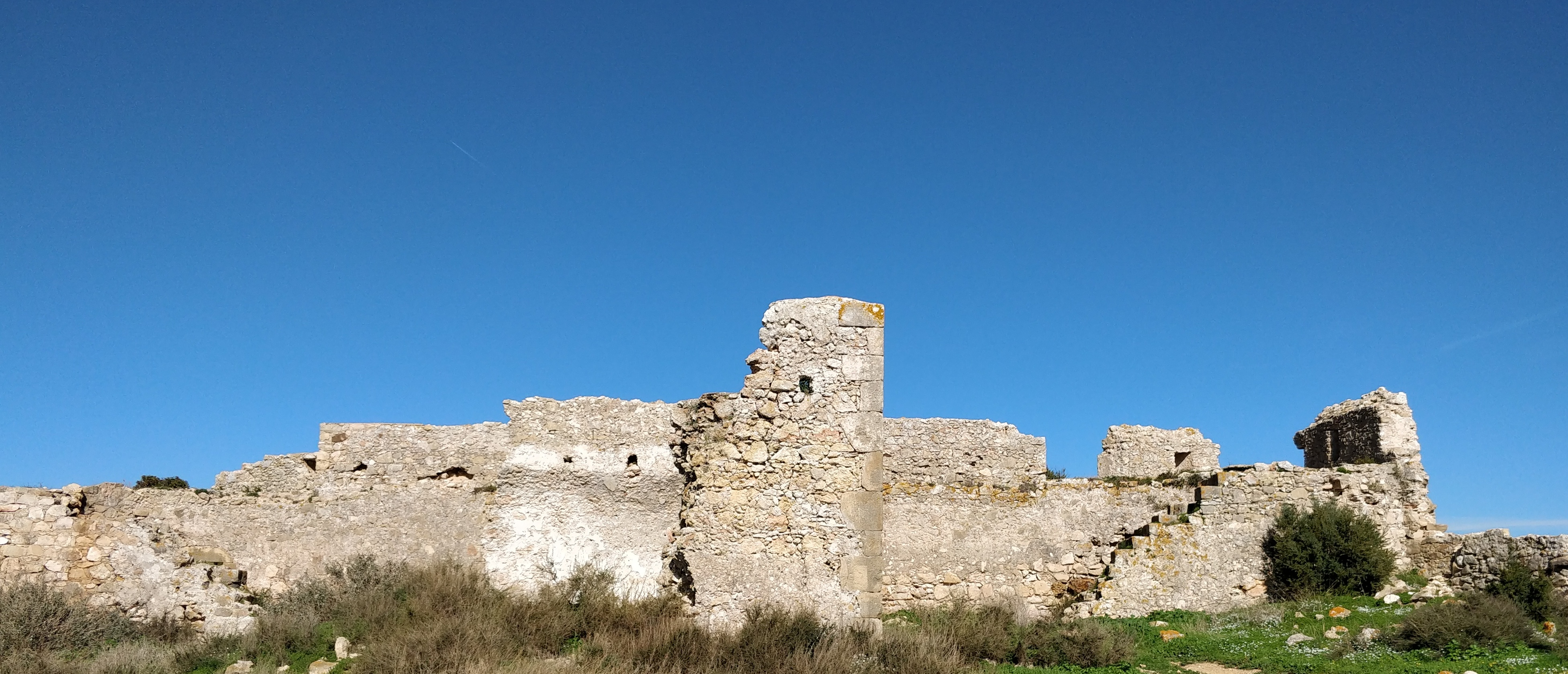
View of the Fort of Almádena, looking west

The fort was transferred to the Portuguese Ministry of Finance in 1940 and to the Municipality of Vila do Bispo in 1946. It is presently in poor condition although some improvements to the area have been made, in part with European Union funding. An inscription stone at the entrance is now in the Lagos regional museum.
