= Yanglingang =

Village in Shanghai and Jiangsu, China

Coordinates: 29°41′N 116°51′E

Yanglingang (simplified Chinese: 杨林岗村; traditional Chinese: 楊林崗村) is a small fishing village located on the border between Shanghai and Jiangsu province, China. The village has approximately fifty families, who obtain their sustenance by fishing and obtaining drinking water from the Yangtze River, which has significant problems with pollution. The village is "surrounded by power plants, paper-making factories, and chemical plants". Village residents live on their boats.

== See also ==
- List of fishing villages
- List of villages in China
