= Community-supported fishery =

A community-supported fishery (CSF) is an alternative business model for selling fresh, locally sourced seafood. CSF programs, modeled after increasingly popular community-supported agriculture programs, offer members weekly shares of fresh seafood for a pre-paid membership fee. The first CSF program was started in Port Clyde, Maine, in 2007, and similar CSF programs have since been started across the United States and in Europe. Community supported fisheries aim to promote a positive relationship between fishermen, consumers, and the ocean by providing high-quality, locally caught seafood to members. CSF programs began as a method to help marine ecosystems recover from the effects of overfishing while maintaining a thriving fishing community.

== Structure ==
In a CSF, consumers sign up as members and pay in advance for a "share" of seafood, to be delivered weekly. Generally, each share is measured by weight but the size of shares offered varies among programs. Many programs offer multiple levels of membership, depending on the size of a share a member wants (i.e., individual share or family share). Each CSF offers a different variety of seafood to its members, based on local regulations, catch size, season, and location. Some CSFs may specialize in a specific species of seafood, while others may offer a variety of species based on what is currently available. Though many aspects of CSF programs are unique to specific programs, according to the organization Local Catch, there are 5 main elements that unite all CSF programs:

1. To establish a transparent chain-of-custody from boat to plate
2. To increase access to premium, locally-caught seafood
3. To ensure fishers receive a fair price for their catch that reflects the value of their work
4. To engage fishers and community members in more robust, viable, local food systems
5. To provide a framework through which fishers and customers alike can creatively steward marine resources

Combined, these elements are often considered the basis for conducting the program on a triple bottom line.

=== Triple bottom line ===
Community-supported fishery programs operate on a triple bottom line, which incorporates environmental stewardship, economic stability, and social improvements as goals of their business. The success of each aspect is intricately tied to the success of other two, creating a balance that benefits the fishermen, the consumers, and the health of the environment.

==== Economic stability ====
CSFs began primarily with economic stability as a goal. Due to increased regulatory pressures, many small fishing communities were on the verge of disappearing. By creating a local market for seafood that bypassed the traditionally lengthy seafood supply chain, fishermen were able to continue working. Fishermen were also able to obtain a small price premium for their catch, which allowed them to be more flexible in their fishing practices. Further, by paying in advance, consumers are participating in a form of risk sharing with fishermen, who are assured of a buyer for their catch before they leave the harbor.

==== Social improvements ====
In creating a program that provides a direct connection between fishermen and consumers, CSF programs aim to rebuild the relationship between people and the food they eat. This relationship was lost with the rise of commercial fishing practices. Building a local food community is good for not only for community relations, but also for supporting local economies: people will be more inclined to support their neighbors only if they actually know their neighbors.

==== Environmental stewardship ====
In creating economic and social benefits, fishermen are then able to become stewards of marine ecosystem health, by utilizing practices that better support the fish populations they target. Specifically, many fishermen are able to alter their target species based on what is abundant, not what is in high demand by the larger supply chain. This allows fishermen to get a price that is closer to the cost of harvesting, gives more exploited fish a break, and provides members with more diversity in product. Often the fishermen know what the least destructive method of fishing is, but in the past have been pressured by market demands to go after only the highest priced fish (which are generally those most at risk for exploitation). Besides being able to focus on more abundant fish species, CSF fisheries can also supply all fish species that are caught to their consumers, as they can select a range of fish. This effectively eliminates by-catch.

== Pilot projects ==
A 2006 study administered by North Carolina Sea Grant identified community-supported fisheries as a new direct marketing strategy to increase demand for local seafood in Carteret County, North Carolina. This led to the design of the nation's first-ever research project on community-supported fisheries and a 2007 pilot CSF for Carteret County shrimp. While this pilot CSF did not take off with consumers, it did garner the attention of the Gulf of Maine Research Institute and the Island Institute, who invited the researchers to present the CSF idea to local fishermen, including some belonging to the Midcoast Fishermen's Cooperative.

The first successful community-supported fishery program began in 2007 as a pilot project out of Port Clyde, when the Mid-Coast Fishermen's Cooperative teamed up with the First Universalist Church in Rockland, Maine, to deliver fresh shrimp. The pilot proved so successful that in the spring of 2008, the Port Clyde community expanded beyond shrimp and Port Clyde Fresh Catch became a viable business. Today, this program delivers fresh, Maine caught shrimp and groundfish to several different locations throughout their local community. In addition, the Midcoast Fishermen's Coop has opened a processing center where they pick shrimp and fillet fish.

=== Local Catch ===
Local Catch is a network started in the United States in 2011. It aims to connect consumers to CSF programs and foster a community of practice amongst CSFs and other values-based seafood businesses. Local Catch acts as an "online network seeking to increase the visibility of CSFs". The site provides a list of current CSF programs in operation as well as a locator tool to help consumers find a program in their area. As of October 2019, Local Catch listed about 100 programs in operation and over 400 pickup locations in North America.

=== Dock to Dish ===
Dock to Dish is one of the original community-supported fishery programs, and is headquartered in the commercial fishing port of Montauk, NY. Founded in 2012, Dock to Dish co-founders also established the first restaurant supported fishery program in the world, a model which has since proliferated across North and Central America. Over the past five years, Dock to Dish co-founders have worked to create new systems for providing reliable access to fresh, locally-harvested and traceable artisanal seafood directly to their cooperative membership from regional fishing wharfs and commercial docks. The seafood they source and distribute is traceable back to the vessel, and often the actual fisherman; never travels by air (the highest carbon producing mode of transport), and never leaves a 150-mile radius from the port that it was originally landed in. Dock to Dish now serves a broad spectrum of restaurants, resorts and institutional-level members, such as the Google Corporation, in restaurant-supported fishery programs while providing limited local seafood shares to families through its community-supported fishery program. In June 2017, the Dock to Dish model was presented at the United Nations World Oceans Conference as an important initiative in achieving The United Nations' Sustainable Development Goal 14 aimed to: "conserve and sustainably use the oceans, seas and marine resources."

=== Sitka Seafood Market ===
Sitka Seafood Market (formerly Sitka Salmon Shares) was co-founded in 2011 and 2012 by Nic Mink, then a professor as Knox College, and fisherman Marsh Skeele, as a small project selling boxes of Skeele's high-quality salmon in the midwest to benefit Sitka Conservation Society. Since that time, Sitka Seafood Market has grown to one of the largest community supported fisheries in the U.S. This CSF had a unique, integrated supply chain that includes fishermen owners and the company's own fish processing plant in Sitka, Alaska, as well as a large warehouse in Galesburg, Illinois. However, Sitka closed their processing plant in June 2022, and now use other processors. The company now offers delivery to the doorstep of is members of an array of seafood species harvested by its network of fishing families from southeast as well as other region's of Alaska. The company is active in the Local Catch and Slow Fish movements, and is invested in building connections between fish harvesters, its members, and supporting healthy food systems and communities in the places the company operates.

=== Catchbox ===
A CSF in the UK called Catchbox, funded by Defra and established by SeaWeb, was piloted in 2013. The pilot operated in Brighton and Chichester for 12 weeks, running from April to July 2013. Each week in the pilot season, a specified amount of fresh fish was delivered to a pickup point in each location for members to collect and take home. Catchbox used a cooperative model in an attempt to bring fishers and members closer together and to ensure that the governance of the CSF could be transferred to members. The pilot was successful in establishing the CSF and a full evaluation was conducted by sustainability consultants Brook Lyndhurst. As of 2017, Catchbox had resulted in spin-offs Catchbox Worthing and SoleShare based in London

== Challenges ==
Some challenges that have been identified with CSF programs are the following:

- Scale – Some have questioned how much of an effect a small-scale program can have on an issue that is global in scale and complexity. Further, because most CSF programs are still in their beginning stages, they often cannot fully support all the fishermen in their community, who must continue to rely on the unpredictable nature of the traditional supply chain.
- Effectiveness – While it is admirable that CSFs are striving to meet a triple bottom line, there is not quantitative evidence that they are actually providing the benefits they claim. However at least one CSF program, Real Good Fish, has begun the process to create criteria for measuring the impact of CSF programs on economic, social, and environmental factors.

== See also ==
- Artisan fishing
- Fishing village
  - List of fishing villages
- Sustainable fisheries
- Community-supported agriculture
- Local food
