= Salehabad, Pakistan =

Fishing village in Manora, in Karachi, Pakistan

Coordinates: 32°20′N 71°55′E

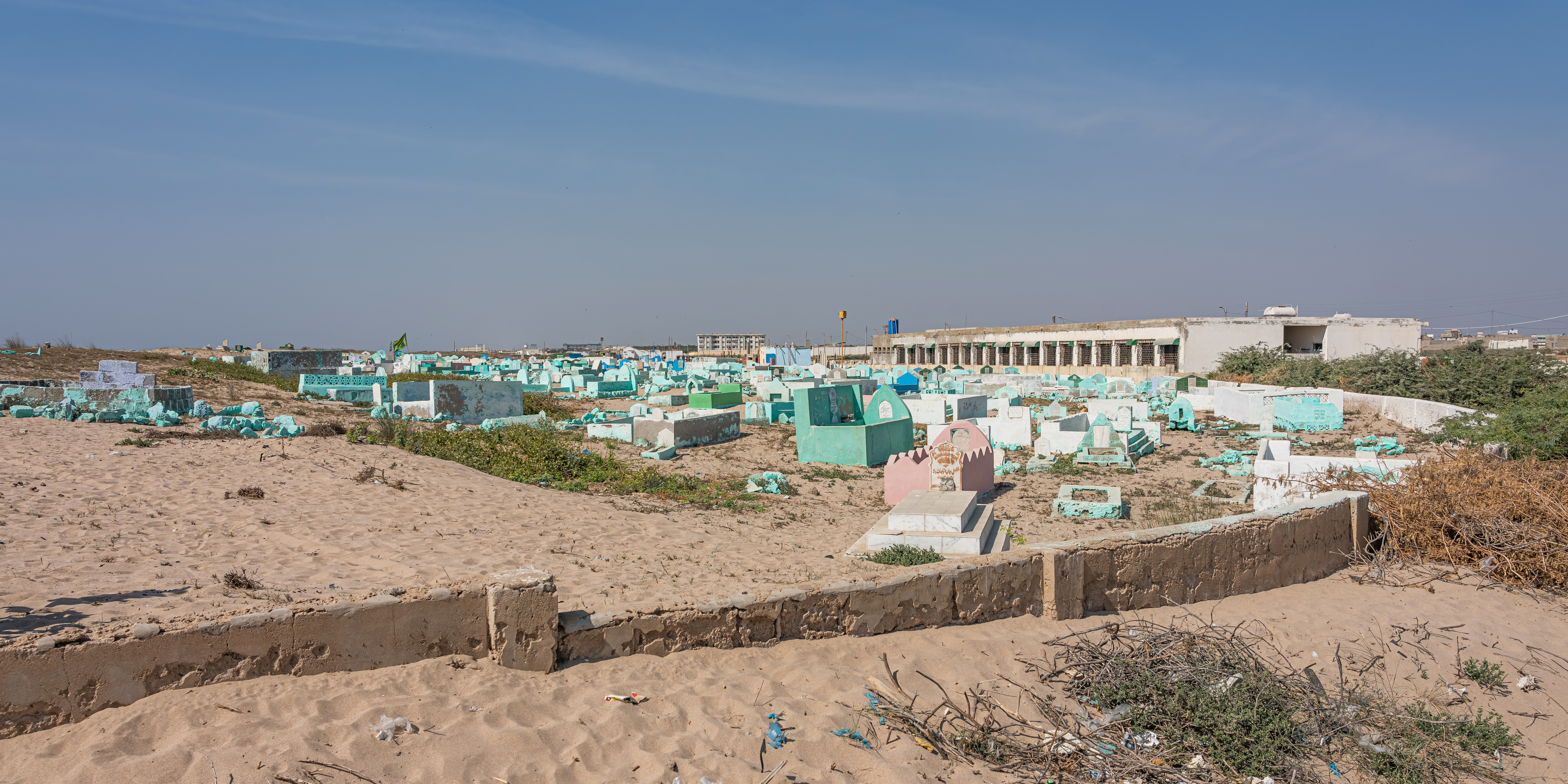
Cemetery of Salehabad

Salehabad is a fishing village in Manora, in Karachi, Sindh, Pakistan. Salehabad used to be an island, but is now connected to Manora. It was connected to Karachi via a ferry service to Kiamari.

Several ethnic groups reside in Kiamari Town, including Sindhis, Muhajirs, Punjabis, Kashmiris, Seraikis, Pakhtuns, Balochis, Memons, Bohras and Ismailis.

Manora is divided into Old Salehabad, New Salehabad and the KPT areas.

Old Salehabad, which is the oldest habitable area of Manora, is a dense residential area of the low-income group majority of whom belongs to the fishing community.

New Salehabad, which is the new addition, is inhabited primarily by the middle-income group, majority of whom are retired Karachi Port Trust (KPT) workers and people from different communities.

== See also ==
- List of fishing villages
