= Duarte Nunes de Leão =

Duarte Nunes de Leão (c. 1530, Évora — 1608, Lisbon) was a Portuguese lawyer, grammarian and historian.

== Works ==
- 1560 - Repertorio dos cinquo liuros das Ordenações : com addições das lejs extrauagantes (Repertoire of the five laws of the Ordinances: with additions of the extractive laws)
- 1566 - Artigos das sisas (Articles of wisdom)
- 1569 - Leis extrauagantes (Extractive laws)
- 1569 - Annotacões sobre as Ordenacões dos cinquo liuros que pelas leis extrauagantes são reuogadas ou interpretadas (Annotations on the Ordinations of the Fifth Liuros that are revoked or interpreted by extractive laws)
- 1576 - Orthographia da lingoa portuguesa (Orthography of the Portuguese language)
- 1590 - Genealogia verdadera de los reyes de Portugal : con sus elogios y summario desus vidas (True genealogy of the Portuguese Kings: with their praise and summary of their lives)
- 1600 - Primeira parte das Chronicas dos reis de Portvgal (First part of the Chronicles of the Kings of Portugal)
- 1606 - Origem da lingoa portvgvesa (Origin of the Portuguese language)

Works edited posthumously:

- 1610 - Descripção do Reino de Portugal (Description of the Kingdom of Portugal)
- 1643 - Cronicas del rey Dom Joaõ de gloriosa memoria, o I deste nome, e dos reys D. Duarte e D. Affonso (Chronicles of the King Dom Joaõ of glorious memory, the first of this name, and of the kings Dom Duarte and Dom Affonso)
