= Alykes, Achaea =

Alykes Αλυκές
- Settlement
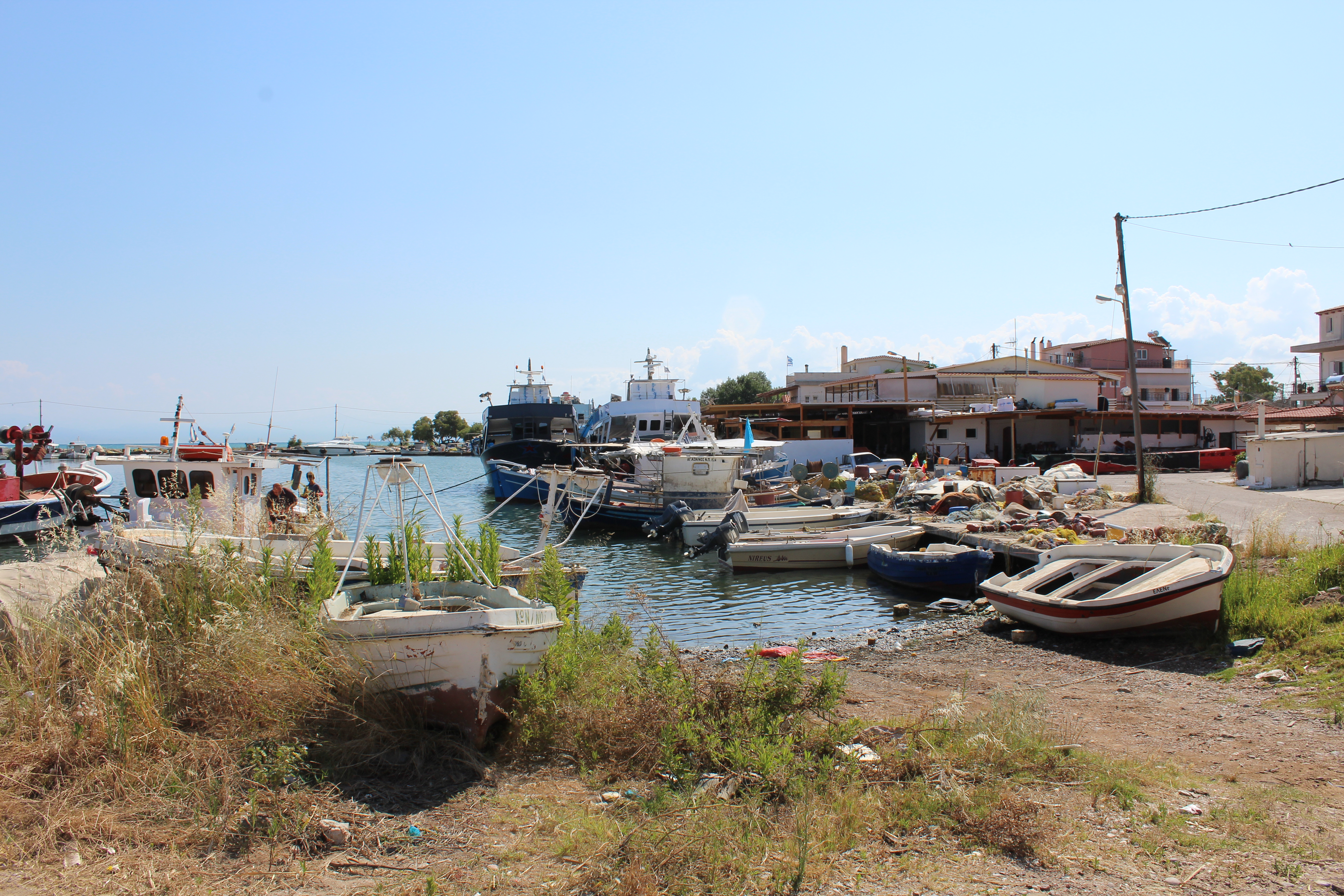

- Location within Greece
- Country: Greece
- Administrative region: Western Greece
- Regional unit: Achaea
- Municipality: West Achaea
- Municipal unit: Dymi
- Community: Kato Achaia

Population (2021)
  - Total: 241
- Time zone: UTC+2 (EET)
  - Summer (DST): UTC+3 (EEST)
- Postal code: 252 00
- Vehicle registration: AP

Alykes (Greek: Αλυκές) is a village in Achaea, Peloponnese, Greece, part of the community of Kato Achaia. An estimated 240 people live permanently there, whose economy is based on fishing.

== History and economy ==
The site of Alykes, meaning "salt pans", is recorded since Venetian times. Along with the salt trade which gave the area its name, in 1865 there existed large storehouses for acorns, which were exported for use in dye production. Alykes was the site of a customs house but did not become a settlement until 1900–5, when the first family, from Spetses settled there. By 1920 there were four families, whose children intermarried; as a result all residents are relatives. Traditionally, the inhabitants of Alykes are all exclusively employed in fishing. The population of the village was barely 50 people in 1940, but had risen to over 200 in the 1991 census.
