= Salema, Portugal =

Village near Vila do Bispo in the Algarve, Portugal

Coordinates: 37.066°N 8.828°W

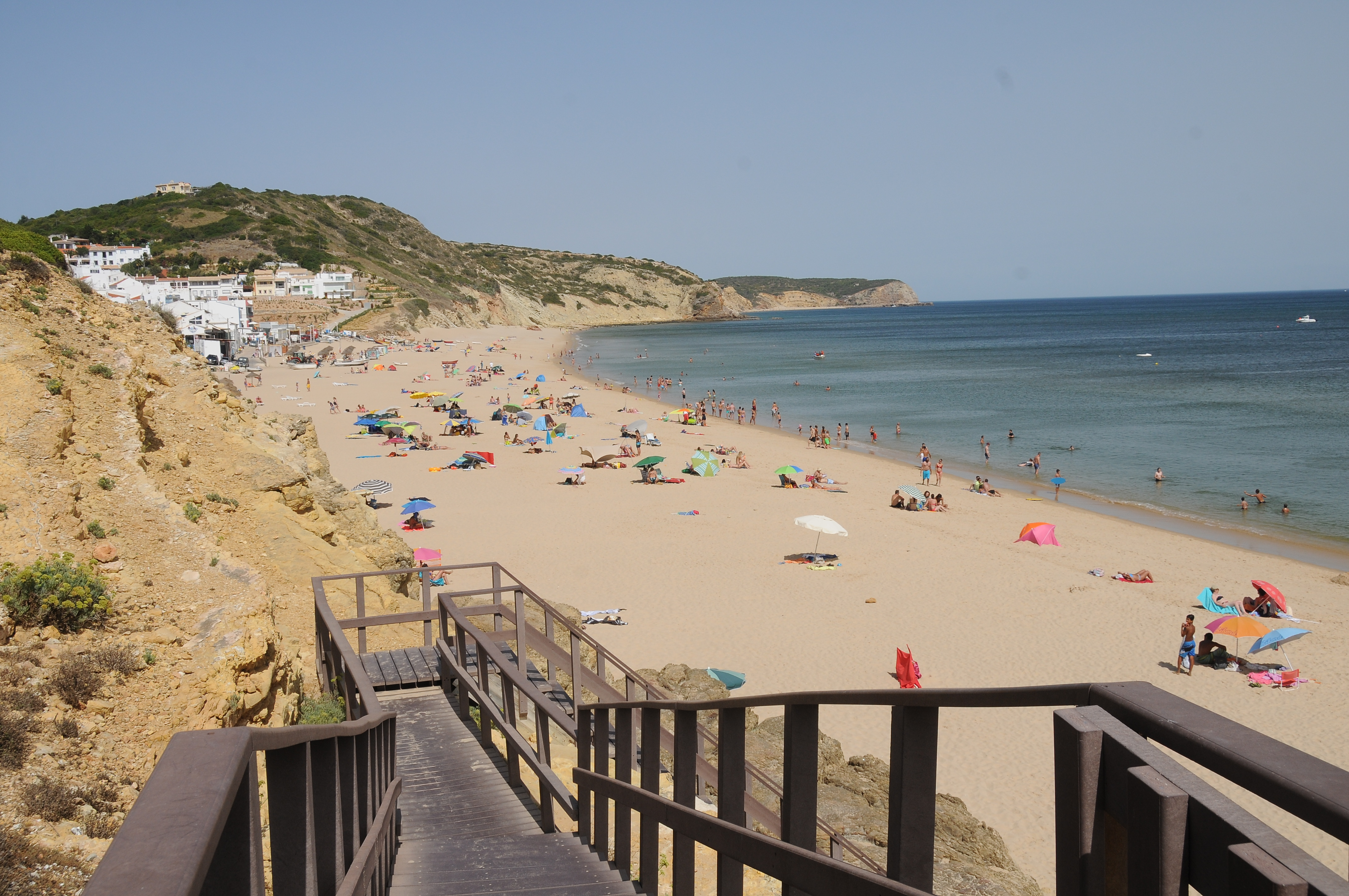
Bay of Salema in August 2011

Salema is a village located near Vila do Bispo in the Algarve, Portugal. Historically it was a fishing village, but at present it is a popular tourist destination.

== Gallery ==
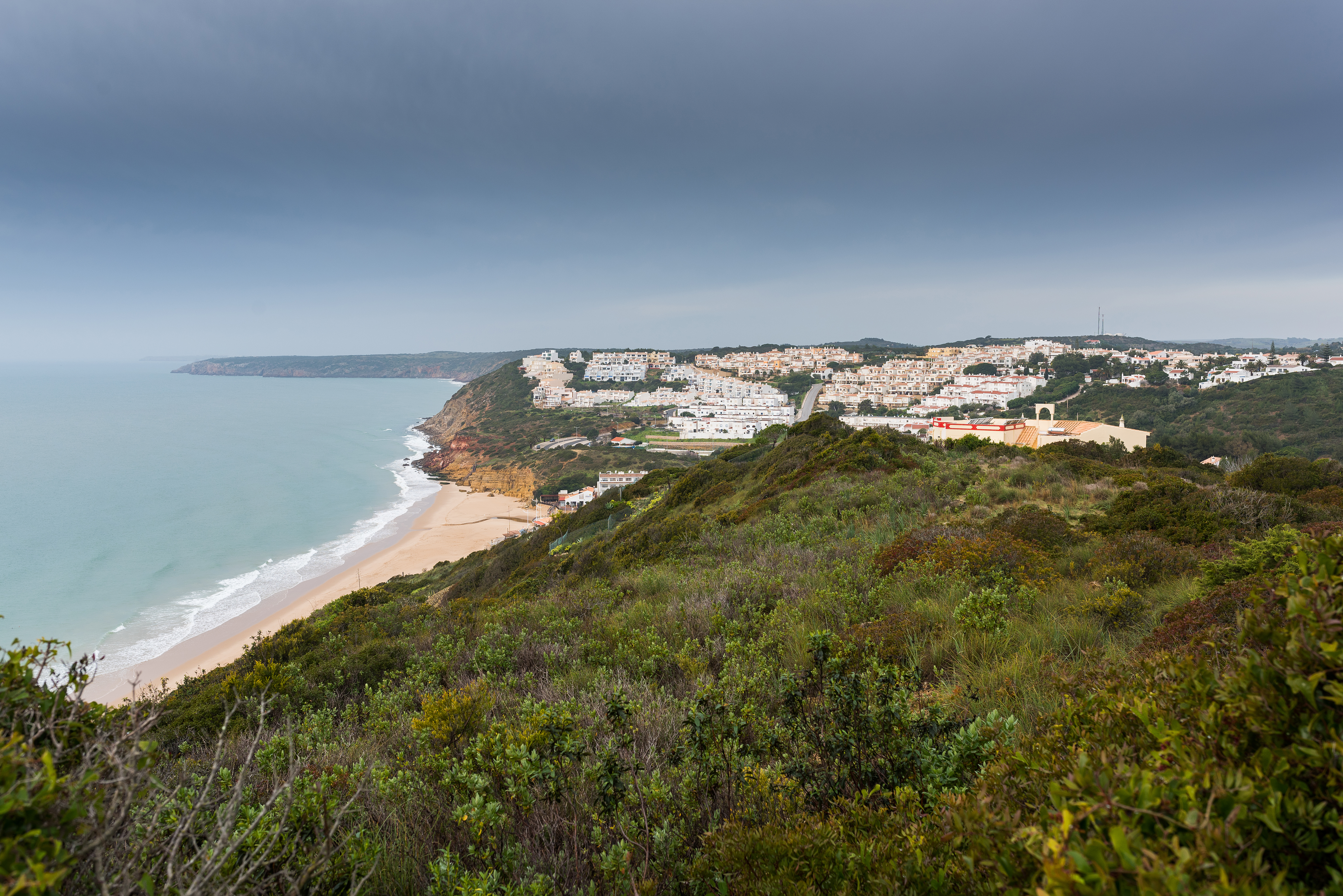
Salema beach February 2015

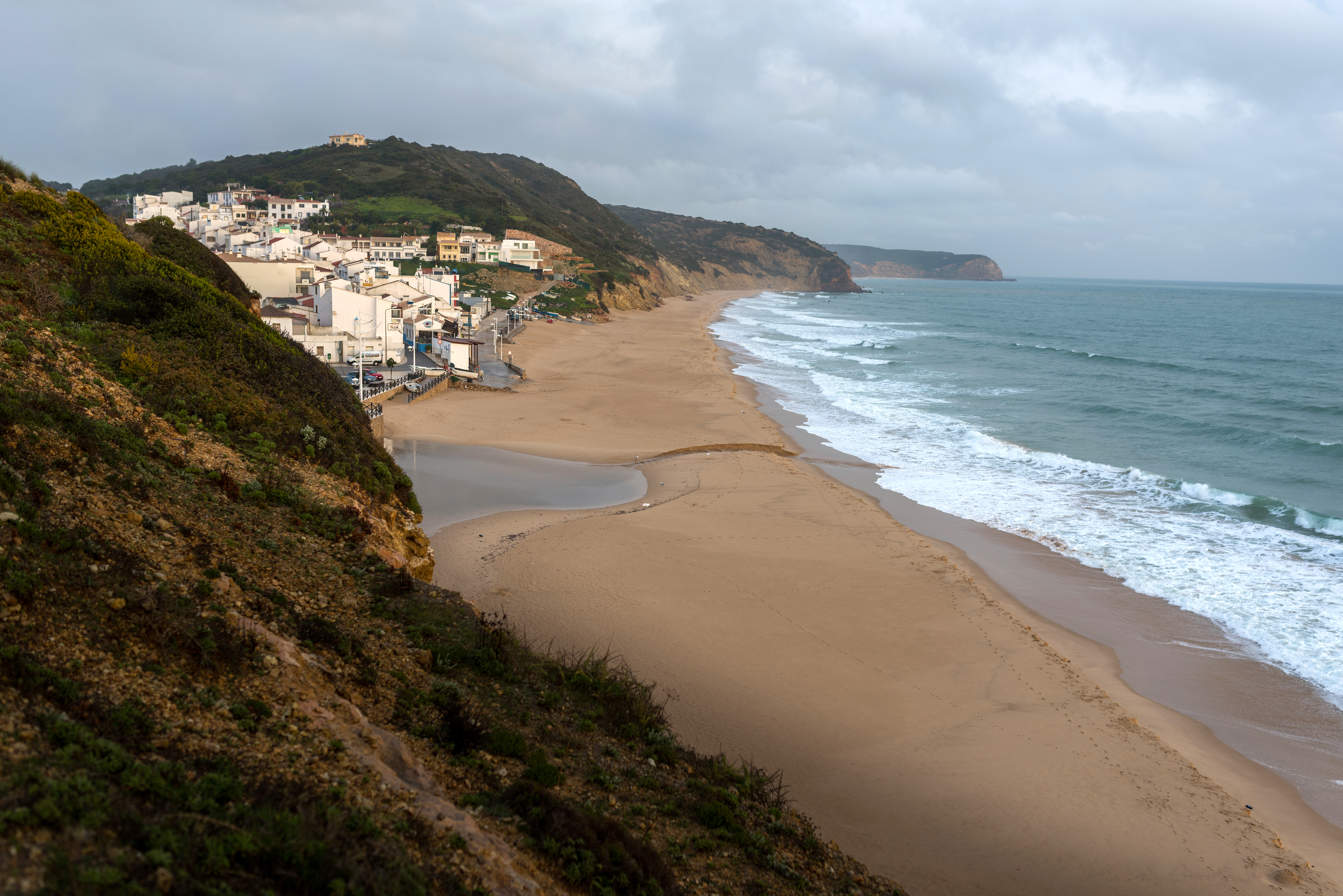
Salema beach February 2015

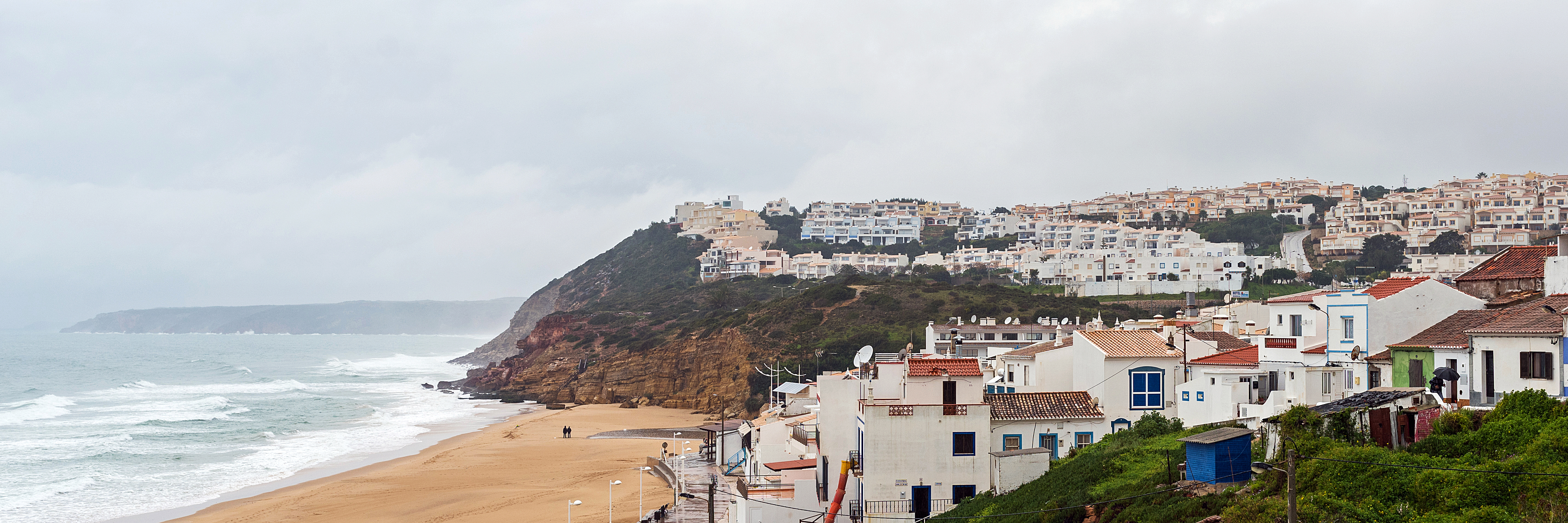
Salema beach February 2015

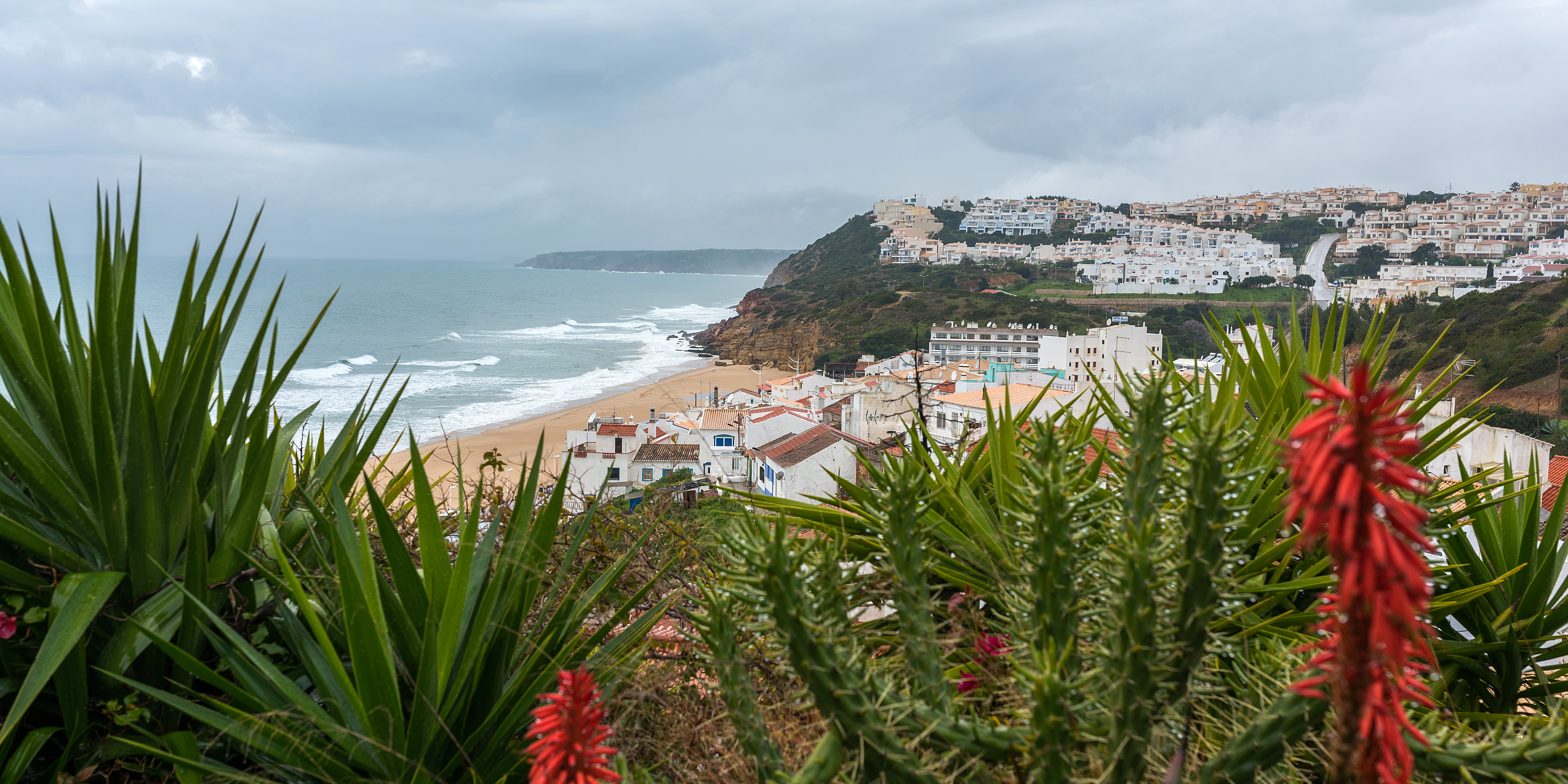
Salema beach February 2015

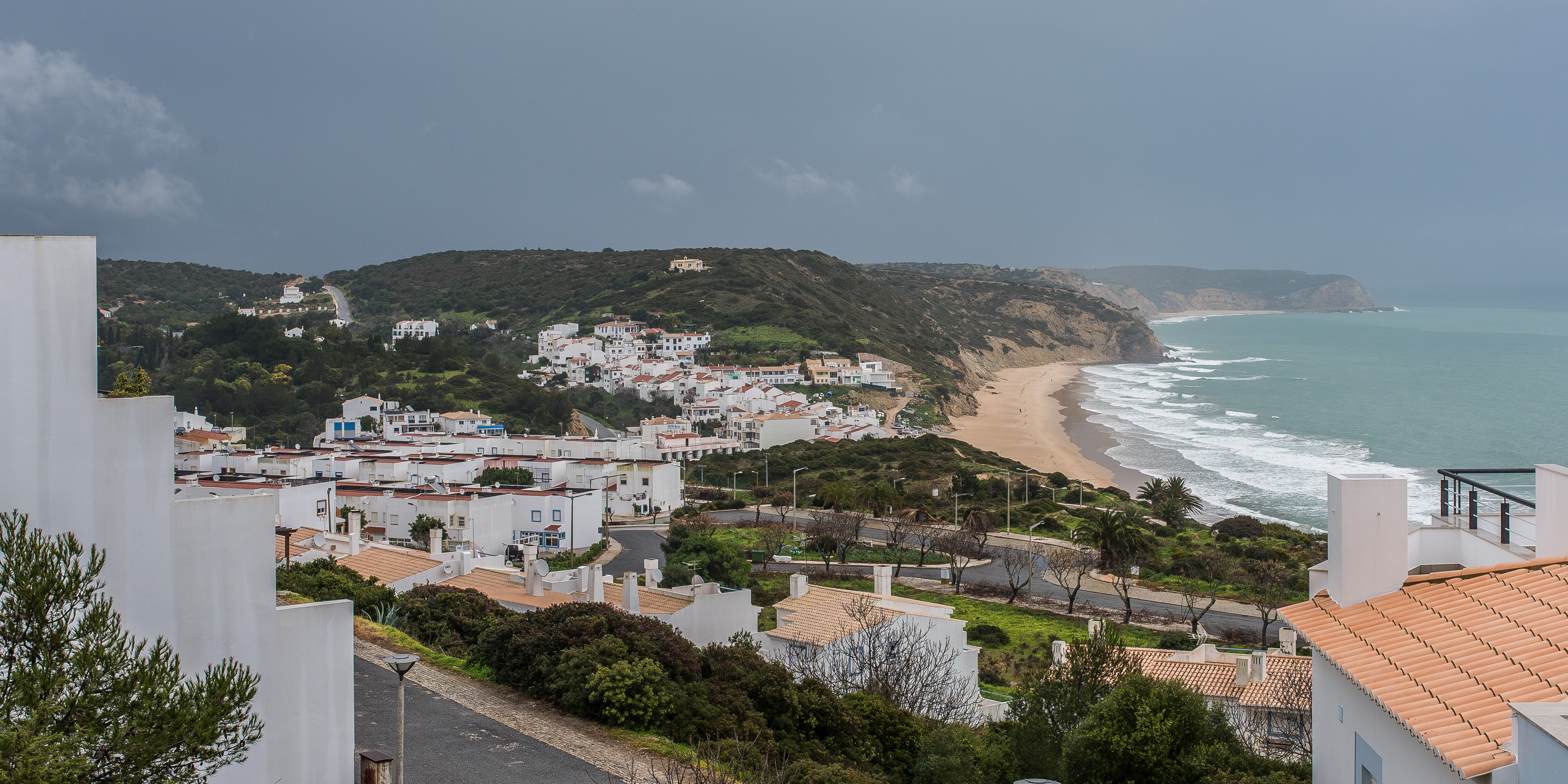
Salema beach Portugal February 2015

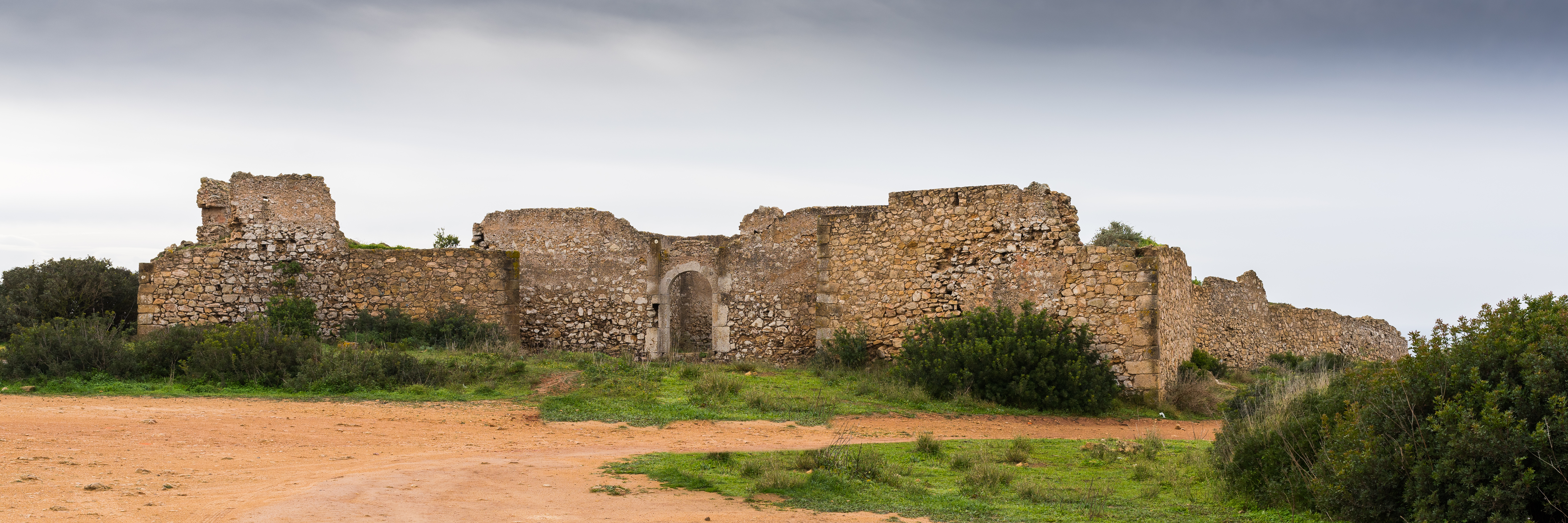
Salema beach February 2015

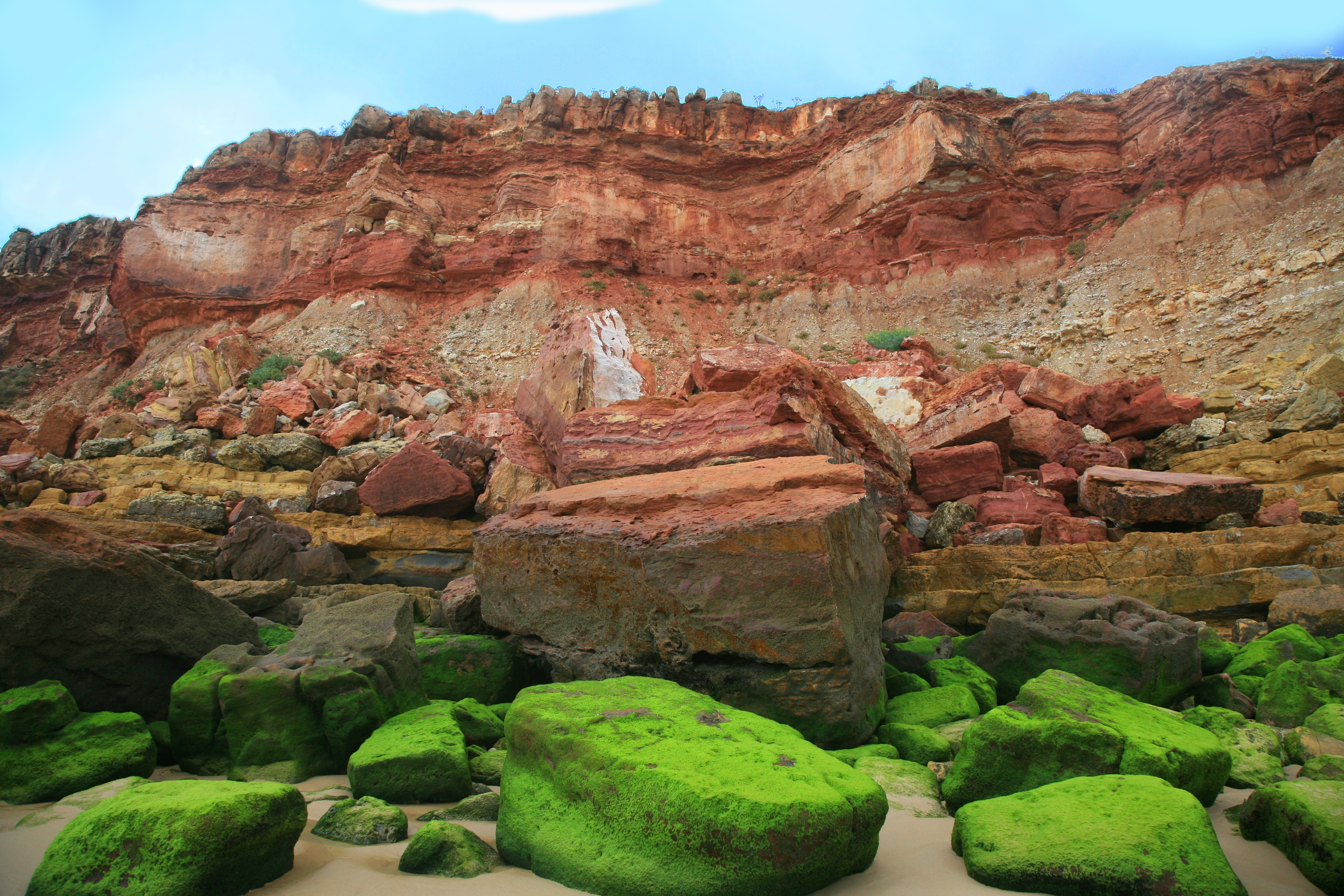
Low tide at Salema beach

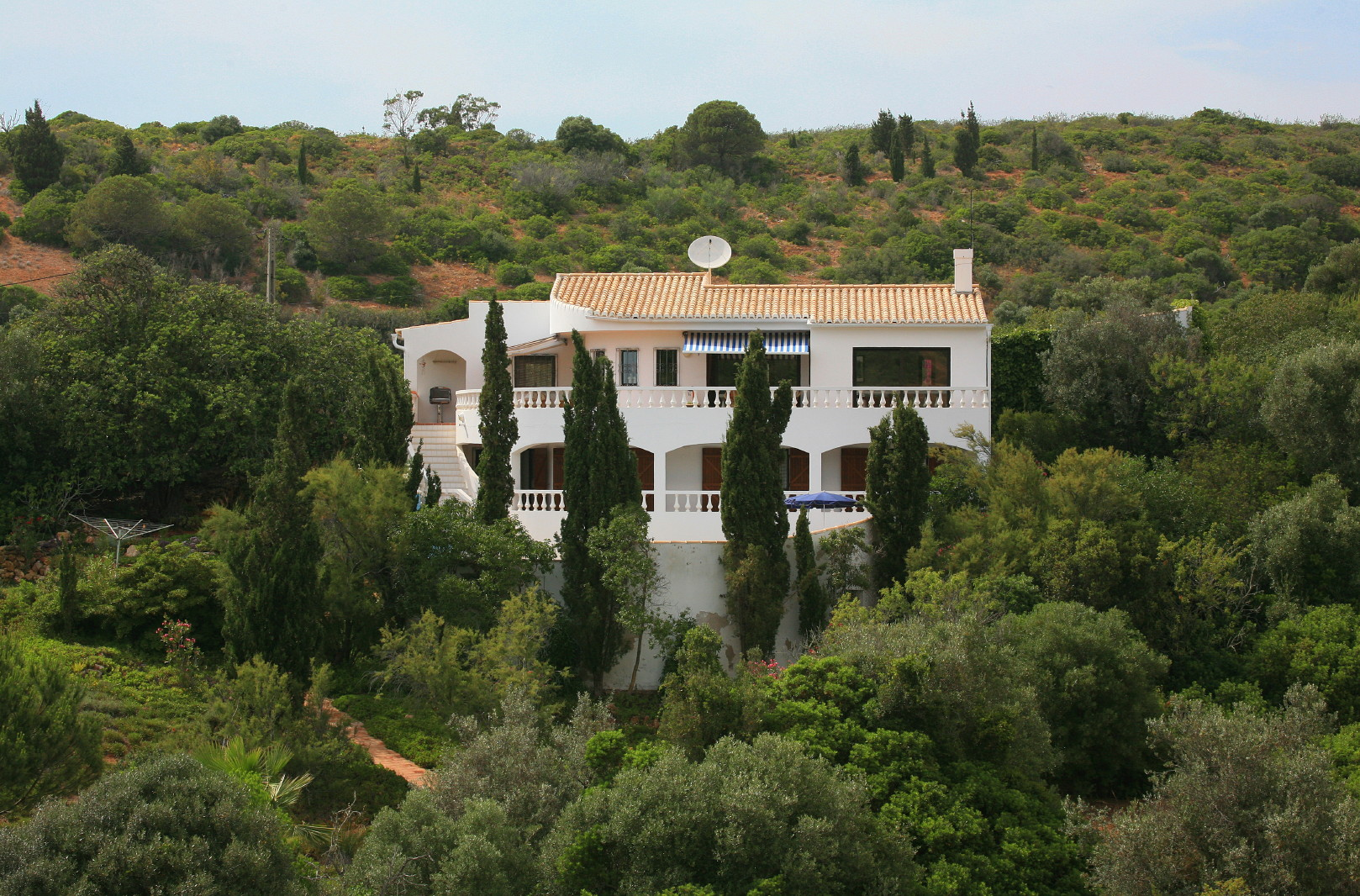
Salema beach February 2015

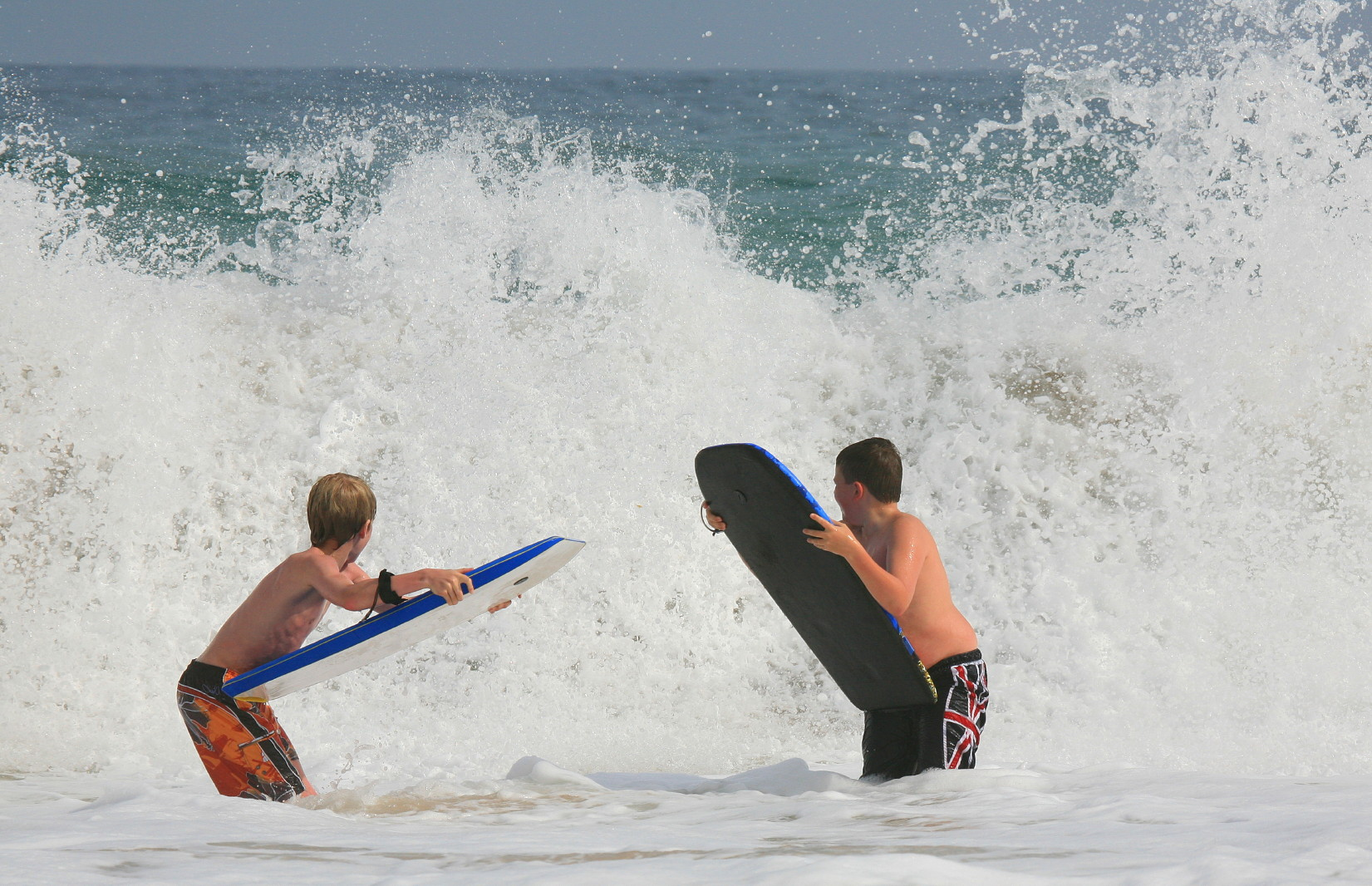
Bodyboarding at Salema beach 2006

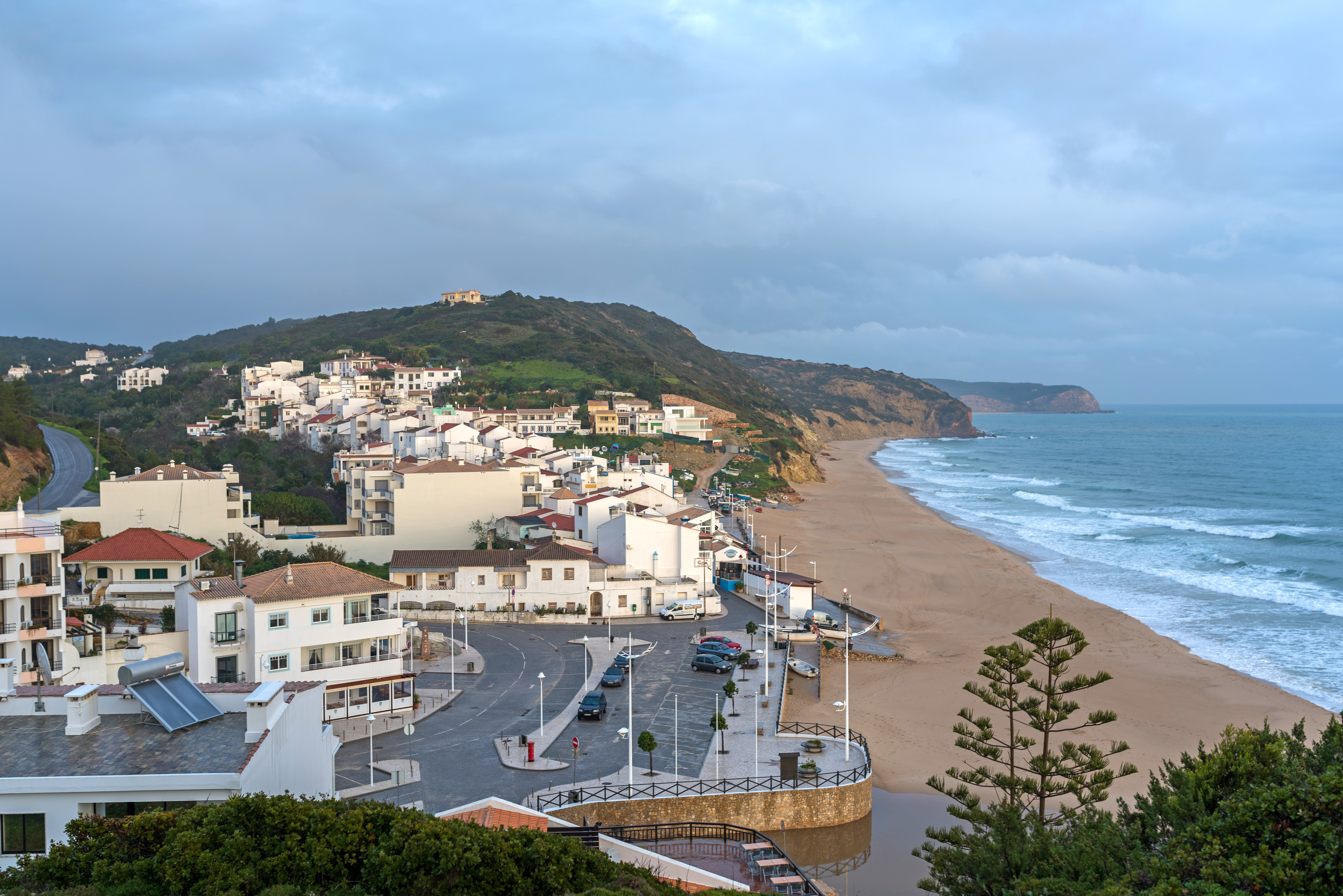
Salema beach Portugal February 2015
